

11001–11100 

|-
| 11001 Andrewulff || 1979 MF || André Wulff (born 1958), German amateur astronomer † || 
|-id=002
| 11002 Richardlis ||  || Richard J. Lis, M.D. (born 1951), an orthopedist and surgeon with the Orthopedic Institute of Pasadena for over 15 years. || 
|-id=003
| 11003 Andronov ||  || Ivan Leonidovich Andronov (born 1960), professor at Odessa National University, is a prominent Ukrainian stellar astrophysicist known for his research on double and symbiotic stars. || 
|-id=004
| 11004 Stenmark ||  || Lars Stenmark (born 1944), a Swedish nanotechnology specialist || 
|-id=005
| 11005 Waldtrudering ||  || Waldtrudering, a residential area in Trudering-Riem, borough of Munich, Germany, home of Danish discoverer Richard Martin West || 
|-id=006
| 11006 Gilson ||  || Jewett Castello Gilson (1844–1926), Californian teacher, author and superintendent of schools. || 
|-id=007
| 11007 Granahan ||  || James C. Granahan (born 1965) is a scientist at Leidos Inc. whose research includes spectroscopic analysis of asteroids Gaspra and Ida using data from the Galileo spacecraft mission. || 
|-id=008
| 11008 Ernst ||  || Carolyn M. Ernst (born 1979) is a planetary scientist at the Johns Hopkins University Applied Physics Laboratory specializing in impact physics of asteroids and other solar system objects. || 
|-id=009
| 11009 Sigridclose ||  || Sigrid Close (born 1971) is a professor at Stanford University whose research includes meteoroid plasma detection using radar and space weather measurements using spacecraft. || 
|-id=010
| 11010 Artemieva ||  || Natalia A. Artemieva (born 1959) is a Russian planetary scientist known for her theoretical work on impacts of interplanetary bodies into planets and planetary satellites. || 
|-id=011
| 11011 KIAM ||  || KIAM is the English abbreviation for the Keldysh Institute of Applied Mathematics of the Russian Academy of Sciences. || 
|-id=012
| 11012 Henning ||  || John Henning (born 1947) assisted with the control software development during the conversion of the Palomar 1.2-m Oschin telescope. || 
|-id=013
| 11013 Kullander ||  || Sven Kullander (1936–2014), Swedish physicist || 
|-id=014
| 11014 Svätopluk ||  || Svätopluk (d. 894) was a king of the ancient Slavs and prince of Great Moravia from 871 to 894. || 
|-id=015
| 11015 Romanenko ||  || Boris Ivanovich Romanenko (born 1912) is a veteran of the group studying jet propulsion in Moscow in the 1930s. || 
|-id=016
| 11016 Borisov ||  || Vladimir Aleksandrovich Borisov (1809–1862), regional ethnographer in the town of Shuya and a member of Russian Geography Society. || 
|-id=017
| 11017 Billputnam || 1983 BD || William L. Putnam (1924–2014), the Trustee of the Lowell Observatory. || 
|-id=019
| 11019 Hansrott || 1984 HR || Hans Rott (1858–1884), Austrian composer and organist || 
|-id=020
| 11020 Orwell || 1984 OG || George Orwell (1903–1950), a British writer best known for his novels Animal Farm and Nineteen Eighty-Four || 
|-id=021
| 11021 Foderà ||  || Giorgia Foderà (born 1942) teaches history of astronomy at Palermo University. Curator of the Palermo Observatory museum. || 
|-id=022
| 11022 Serio ||  || Salvatore Serio (born 1941) teaches astronomy at Palermo University, specializing in x-ray observations and modeling of solar and stellar coronae. || 
|-id=026
| 11026 Greatbotkin ||  || Botkin Hospital in Moscow. || 
|-id=027
| 11027 Astafʹev ||  || Victor Petrovich Astafʹev (1924–2001), a prominent Russian writer. || 
|-id=033
| 11033 Mazanek ||  || Dan Mazanek (born 1966) is a space systems engineer at NASA Langley Research Center specializing in the development of asteroid mission concepts. || 
|-id=037
| 11037 Distler ||  || Hugo Distler (1908–1942), a composer, organist and director of renowned choirs. || 
|-id=039
| 11039 Raynal ||  || Guillaume-Thomas Raynal (1713–1796) || 
|-id=040
| 11040 Wundt ||  || Wilhelm Wundt (1832–1920), German physiologist and psychologist || 
|-id=041
| 11041 Fechner ||  || Gustav Fechner (1801–1887), German experimental psychologist || 
|-id=042
| 11042 Ernstweber ||  || Ernst Heinrich Weber (1795–1878), German physiologist and anatomist || 
|-id=043
| 11043 Pepping ||  || Ernst Pepping (1901–1981), German composer || 
|-id=050
| 11050 Messiaën ||  || Olivier Messiaen (1908–1992), a French organist at Ste. Trinité in Paris. || 
|-id=051
| 11051 Racine ||  || Jean-Baptiste Racine (1639–1699), a dramatic poet. || 
|-id=055
| 11055 Honduras ||  || Honduras, in the northern part of the Central American isthmus. || 
|-id=056
| 11056 Volland ||  || Sophie Volland (1720–1784) || 
|-id=059
| 11059 Nulliusinverba || 1991 RS || "Nullius in verba", variously translated as "On the words of no one", "Nothing in words" or "Respect the facts", is the motto of The Royal Society of London for the Improvement of Natural Knowledge. This minor planet is being named on the occasion of the 350th anniversary of the founding of The Royal Society in 1660. || 
|-id=061
| 11061 Lagerlöf ||  || Selma Lagerlöf (1858–1940), a Swedish author. || 
|-id=063
| 11063 Poynting ||  || John Henry Poynting (1852–1914), an English physicist. || 
|-id=064
| 11064 Dogen || 1991 WB || The Japanese priest Dogen Zenji (1200–1253) || 
|-id=066
| 11066 Sigurd ||  || Sigurd || 
|-id=067
| 11067 Greenancy ||  || Nancy Green (born 1952) || 
|-id=069
| 11069 Bellqvist ||  || Sven Bellqvist (1915–2008) was for many years in charge of the workshop at the astronomical observatory in Uppsala. During this time the Schmidt telescopes at Kvistaberg and at Mount Stromlo Observatory were built || 
|-id=072
| 11072 Hiraoka || 1992 GP || Hiroyuki Hiraoka (born 1957), an elementary-school teacher and amateur astronomer, active in the Hiroshima Astronomical Society. || 
|-id=073
| 11073 Cavell ||  || Edith Cavell (1865–1915) || 
|-id=074
| 11074 Kuniwake ||  || Ryoku Kuniwake (born 1957), a longtime member of the Hiroshima Astronomical Society. || 
|-id=075
| 11075 Dönhoff ||  || Countess Marion Dönhoff (1909–2002), German journalist and Hitler resistance participant || 
|-id=079
| 11079 Mitsunori || 1993 AJ || Mitsunori Kaneko (born 1957) is an elementary-school teacher and was secretary of the Fukuoka Astronomical Society from 1981 to 1989. || 
|-id=081
| 11081 Persäve ||  || Per Arvid Säve (1811–1887) was a teacher in Visby who dedicated most of his spare time to research on the dialects and folklore of Gotland. He also founded a museum in Visby, Fornsalen || 
|-id=082
| 11082 Spilliaert || 1993 JW || Léon Spilliaert (1881–1946), a Belgian symbolist painter and graphic artist || 
|-id=083
| 11083 Caracas ||  || Caracas, Venezuela || 
|-id=084
| 11084 Giò ||  || Giuseppe Schilirò (1991–2000), an Italian student || 
|-id=085
| 11085 Isala ||  || Isala Van Diest (1842–1916) || 
|-id=086
| 11086 Nagatayuji ||  || Yuji Nagata (born 1953), former director of the Fukuoka Astronomical Society. || 
|-id=087
| 11087 Yamasakimakoto ||  || Makoto Yamasaki (born 1953), director of the Fukuoka Astronomical Society from 1977 to 1982. || 
|-id=090
| 11090 Popelin ||  || Marie Popelin (1846–1913), a Belgian feminist, who became the first Belgian woman to receive a doctorate in law || 
|-id=091
| 11091 Thelonious || 1994 DP || Thelonious Monk (1917–1982), American jazz pianist and composer || 
|-id=092
| 11092 Iwakisan || 1994 ED || Mount Iwaki || 
|-id=094
| 11094 Cuba ||  || Cuba is an island state in the Caribbean Sea, consisting of one large island and numerous smaller islands, islets and cays. || 
|-id=095
| 11095 Havana ||  || Havana, Cuba || 
|-id=098
| 11098 Ginsberg ||  || Allen Ginsberg (1926–1997), an American lyric poet and teacher. || 
|-id=099
| 11099 Sonodamasaki || 1995 HL || Masaki Sonoda (born 1954), an associate president of the Saga Astronomical Society since 1989. || 
|-id=100
| 11100 Lai || 1995 KC || Luciano Lai (born 1948), Italian observer and discoverer of minor planets at Madonna di Dossobuono Observatory, Italy. || 
|}

11101–11200 

|-
| 11101 Českáfilharmonie || 1995 SH || Czech Philharmonic Orchestra. || 
|-id=102
| 11102 Bertorighini ||  || Alberto Righini (born 1942), a professor of astronomy at the University of Florence and Arcetri Observatory || 
|-id=103
| 11103 Miekerouppe ||  || Mieke Rouppe, member of the Dutch resistance in The Hague in World War II † || 
|-id=104
| 11104 Airion || 1995 TQ || Evelyn Airion Enyart (born 1952) teaches seminars in healing techniques. She was born in Louisiana, raised in Guatemala and educated at the University of New Mexico, receiving degrees in both Communications and Sign Language. She presents workshops around the world, writes books and produces videos on healing techniques. || 
|-id=105
| 11105 Puchnarová ||  || Dana Puchnarová (born 1938), Czech painter and graphic artist || 
|-id=107
| 11107 Hakkoda ||  || Hakkōda Mountains a Japanese mountain range in northernmost Honshu. || 
|-id=108
| 11108 Hachimantai ||  || Hachimantai is a beautiful highland. Some 1600 m high, it forms a part of the Ohu-Mountains located in northern Honshu. It is named as one of the 100 most celebrated mountains of Japan. || 
|-id=109
| 11109 Iwatesan ||  || Mount Iwate (Iwate-san) is a Japanese volcano with a peak of 2041 m that erupted a few years ago. It is located on the east of Mount Hachimantai. || 
|-id=111
| 11111 Repunit || 1995 WL || A repunit ("repeated unity") is a number consisting solely of the digit 1. The term was coined by Albert H. Beiler in his 1964 book Recreations in the Theory of Numbers || 
|-id=112
| 11112 Cagnoli ||  || Antonio Cagnoli (1743–1816) an Italian astronomer, who helped establish the Società Italiana ("Italian Society"), a.k.a. the Società dei XL ("Society of the Forty"), ancestor of the Accademia Nazionale delle Scienze detta dei XL ("National Academy of Sciences known as the Forty") || 
|-id=115
| 11115 Kariya ||  || Kariya City, located in the center of Aichi Prefecture, Japan. The discoverer, Akimasa Nakamura, had lived there for some time. || 
|-id=117
| 11117 Giuseppeolongo ||  || Giuseppe O. Longo (born 1941) an Italian mathematician and engineer at the University of Trieste. He is also the scientific manager of the astronomical society (Circolo Culturale Astronomico di Farra d'Isonzo) at the Farra d'Isonzo Observatory (Src). || 
|-id=118
| 11118 Modra || 1996 PK || Astronomické observatórium Modra-Piesok (Astronomical Observatory of Modra-Piesok), near Modra, Slovakia † || 
|-id=119
| 11119 Taro ||  || Soutaro Ito (born 1925) has contributed much to the popularization of astronomy and established the Nanyo Astronomical Lovers Club in 1983. He was central to the establishment in 1986 of the society's observatory, the Nanyo Civil Astronomical Observatory. || 
|-id=120
| 11120 Pancaldi ||  || Enelio Pancaldi (born 1947), an Italian amateur astronomer. || 
|-id=121
| 11121 Malpighi ||  || Marcello Malpighi (1628–1694) holds a prominent position in the history of medicine and biology, working in Pisa, Bologna, Messina and Rome. A pioneer in the use of the microscope in anatomy, he made fundamental studies of the lungs. He later made contributions in hematology and embryology. || 
|-id=122
| 11122 Eliscolombini ||  || Elis Colombini (born 1957) is the editor of publications on the local history of his birthplace of Modena and the surrounding province. || 
|-id=123
| 11123 Aliciaclaire ||  || Alicia Claire Contrite (born 1966) is an extraordinarily devoted mother, wife and daughter. She is a prosecuting attorney for the city of Santa Monica, California, primarily concerned with the plight of abused women. The citation was prepared by M. Hibbs, Alicia's mother, at the request of E. Helin of the NEAT team. || 
|-id=124
| 11124 Mikulášek ||  || Zdeněk Mikulášek (born 1947), Czech astronomer and director of the Nicholas Copernicus Observatory and Planetarium in Brno || 
|-id=126
| 11126 Doleček ||  || Josef ("Jožka") Doleček (born 1912) had a principal role in building the public observatory of Valašské Meziříčí and was its first director. His work gave a basis for the observatory's success in astronomy popularization in the Czech Republic. || 
|-id=127
| 11127 Hagi ||  || The name Hagi-Lespedeza is derived from the flower in the symbol of Sendai City, Japan. || 
|-id=128
| 11128 Ostravia || 1996 VP || Latin name for Ostrava, Czech Republic || 
|-id=129
| 11129 Hayachine ||  || Mount Hayachine is located in the Kitakami highlands of Japan || 
|-id=132
| 11132 Horne || 1996 WU || Johnny Horne (born 1953), an American amateur astronomer since age 10 from North Carolina || 
|-id=133
| 11133 Kumotori || 1996 XY || Mount Kumotori, the highest peak in the Tokyo Metropolis, Japan || 
|-id=134
| 11134 České Budějovice ||  || České Budějovice, a city in the Czech Republic || 
|-id=135
| 11135 Ryokami ||  || Mount Ryōkami is located at the northern part of the Kanto plain. It is known for its exceptionally unique shape that looks like the blade of a saw. The stunning landscape it outlines in the Kanto mountains makes it one of the 100 most celebrated mountains of Japan. || 
|-id=136
| 11136 Shirleymarinus ||  || Shirley Marinus (born 1921) served during a third of a century as secretary in the Lunar and Planetary Laboratory for the Polariscope program, the Imaging Photopolarimeters on Pioneers 10 and 11, the Space Science Series textbooks, and the Spacewatch survey of comets and minor planets. || 
|-id=137
| 11137 Yarigatake ||  || Mount Yari (Yari-ga-take) has a characteristic pear-shaped peak. A difficult and challenging 3180-meter climb, it is one of the 100 most celebrated mountains in Japan. || 
|-id=138
| 11138 Hotakadake ||  || Mount Hotakadake is the generic name of several mountain peaks, some of them more than 3000 meters high, in central Japan. || 
|-id=140
| 11140 Yakedake ||  || Mount Yake volcano, Japan || 
|-id=141
| 11141 Jindrawalter ||  || Jindřich Walter (born 1941), Czech physicist || 
|-id=142
| 11142 Facchini ||  || Renato Facchini (born 1917), a well-known Italian amateur astronomern. || 
|-id=144
| 11144 Radiocommunicata ||  || Radio communication, in honour of the Kleť broadcasting tower staff || 
|-id=145
| 11145 Emanuelli ||  || Pio Emanuelli (1888–1946), an Italian astronomer at the Vatican Observatory and teaching astronomy and history of astronomy at Rome University Img || 
|-id=146
| 11146 Kirigamine ||  || Mount Kirigamine, one of the 100 Famous Japanese Mountains || 
|-id=147
| 11147 Delmas ||  || Robert Delmas (born 1955), a French aeronautical engineer. || 
|-id=148
| 11148 Einhardress ||  || Einhard Ress (born 1936), an engineer and scientist at the German Aerospace Center (DLR). || 
|-id=149
| 11149 Tateshina ||  || Mount Tateshina volcano, one of the 100 Famous Japanese Mountains || 
|-id=150
| 11150 Bragg ||  || Sir William Henry Bragg (1862−1942), British physicist, chemist and mathematician, who received the Nobel prize in physics in 1915. || 
|-id=151
| 11151 Oodaigahara ||  || Mount Ōdaigahara, one of the "100 Famous Japanese Mountains", in the National Park of Yoshino-Kumano and a UNESCO World Heritage Site || 
|-id=152
| 11152 Oomine ||  || Mount Ōmine, in the middle of the Kii peninsula, in the National Park of Yoshino-Kumano, one of the 100 Famous Japanese Mountains, a UNESCO World Heritage Site || 
|-id=154
| 11154 Kobushi ||  || Mount Kobushi, one of the 100 Famous Japanese Mountains, in the Oku-Chichibu area, stretching over the three states of Kōshū, Bushu, and Shinshu || 
|-id=155
| 11155 Kinpu ||  || Mount Kinpu, one of the 100 Famous Japanese Mountains, in the Oku-Chichibu area || 
|-id=156
| 11156 Al-Khwarismi ||  || Muhammad ibn Musa Al-Khwarismi (fl. c. 825) was an Arab mathematician and astronomer whose books, translated into Latin, were the main source through which Indian numerals and Arabic algebra came into Western Europe. || 
|-id=158
| 11158 Cirou ||  || Alain Cirou (born 1958) is editor of Ciel et Espace magazine. || 
|-id=159
| 11159 Mizugaki ||  || Mount Mizugaki is located at the western end of the Oku-Chichibu mountain chain. It has a particularly strange appearance, composed of large, humped rocks. || 
|-id=161
| 11161 Daibosatsu ||  || Daibosatu mountain, which has a 2057-m peak, is located on the northern end of the Koganesawa mountain chain in Japan || 
|-id=163
| 11163 Milešovka || 1998 CR || Milešovka, the highest mountain in the Bohemian Highlands (Czech České středohoří), on the occasion of 100 years of observations from the meteorological observatory there || 
|-id=166
| 11166 Anatolefrance ||  || Anatole France (1844–1924), French writer || 
|-id=167
| 11167 Kunžak ||  || Kunžak is a picturesque village in South Bohemia, Czech Republic || 
|-id=169
| 11169 Alkon ||  || Andy L. Alkon (born 1986), an ISEF awardee in 2002 || 
|-id=173
| 11173 Jayanderson ||  || Jay S. Anderson (born 1985), an ISEF awardee in 2002 || 
|-id=174
| 11174 Carandrews ||  || Carolyn Marie Andrews (born 1984), an ISEF awardee in 2002 || 
|-id=176
| 11176 Batth ||  || Sukhjeet Singh Batth (born 1985), an ISEF awardee in 2002 || 
|-id=184
| 11184 Postma ||  || Sep Postma (1921–1944), member of the Dutch resistance in World War II † || 
|-id=187
| 11187 Richoliver ||  || Richard C. Oliver (born 1948), an electronics specialist at the Lowell Observatory. || 
|-id=189
| 11189 Rabeaton ||  || Rachael Lynn Beaton (born 1985), an ISEF awardee in 2002 || 
|-id=190
| 11190 Jennibell ||  || Jennifer Marie Bell (born 1984), an ISEF awardee in 2002 || 
|-id=191
| 11191 Paskvić ||  || Ivan Paskvić (1754–1829), Croatian founder and director of the Buda Observatory || 
|-id=193
| 11193 Mérida ||  || Mérida, a Venezuelan city, named in 1558 by Juan Rodriguez Suarez, is also known as "the city of the gentlemen" for its hospitality; "the city of the snowing mountains" for the surrounding Andes; and "the university city" for its famous Universidad de Los Andes. || 
|-id=194
| 11194 Mirna || 1998 YE || Mirna river, Croatia || 
|-id=195
| 11195 Woomera ||  || Woomera, Aboriginal for spear thrower, is a village in the Australian outback founded in 1947 as a rocket rangehead. || 
|-id=196
| 11196 Michanikos ||  || Heron of Alexandria, also known as "Michanikos, the machine man" (c. 10-75), invented many automatic contrivances long before the age of the computer. || 
|-id=197
| 11197 Beranek ||  || Benjamin Charles Beranek (born 1984), an ISEF awardee in 2002 || 
|}

11201–11300 

|-
| 11201 Talich ||  || Václav Talich (1883–1961), a well-known Czech conductor. || 
|-id=202
| 11202 Teddunham ||  || Edward W. Dunham (born 1952), an astronomer at the Lowell Observatory. || 
|-id=203
| 11203 Danielbetten ||  || Daniel Price Betten (born 1987), an ISEF awardee in 2002 || 
|-id=206
| 11206 Bibee ||  || Kristin Page Bibee (born 1984), an ISEF awardee in 2002 || 
|-id=207
| 11207 Black ||  || Maribeth Joanne Black (born 1984), an ISEF awardee in 2002 || 
|-id=212
| 11212 Tebbutt || 1999 HS || John Tebbutt (1834–1916) was an Australian astronomer whose observations included many comets and the 1874 transit of Venus. His name is particularly associated with the great comets of 1861 and 1881. He was the first president of the New South Wales branch of the British Astronomical Association. || 
|-id=216
| 11216 Billhubbard ||  || William B. Hubbard (born 1940) is a planetary scientist studying interiors and atmospheres at the Lunar and Planetary Laboratory of the University of Arizona, where he was also director during 1977–1981. His studies include the structure and evolution of Jupiter, Saturn and extrasolar giant planets || 
|-id=219
| 11219 Benbohn ||  || Benjamin Josef Bohn (born 1985), an ISEF awardee in 2002 || 
|-id=225
| 11225 Borden ||  || Timothy Calvin Borden (born 1985), an ISEF awardee in 2002 || 
|-id=227
| 11227 Ksenborisova ||  || Ksenia V. Borisova (born 1983), an ISEF awardee in 2002 || 
|-id=228
| 11228 Botnick ||  || Aaron Michael Botnick (born 1984), an ISEF awardee in 2002 || 
|-id=229
| 11229 Brookebowers ||  || Brooke Nacole Bowers (born 1986), an ISEF awardee in 2002 || 
|-id=238
| 11238 Johanmaurits || 2044 P-L || Count John Maurice, Prince of Nassau-Siegen (1604–1679), governor of Dutch Brazil (1637–1644), was the founder of the first astronomical observatory and meteorological station by a non-American in the Americas. During his reign he stimulated the arts, science and freedom of religion and created local councils to govern Dutch Brazil. || 
|-id=239
| 11239 Marcgraf || 4141 P-L || Georg Marcgrave (1610–1643), German-Dutch astronomer, mathematician and naturalist, made the first serious study of the southern sky during his stay in Dutch Brazil. He is also known for his zoological and cartographic work during the reign of Johan Maurits in Dutch Brazil. Marcgraf died in 1643 in Luanda (then Dutch Angola). || 
|-id=240
| 11240 Piso || 4175 P-L || Willem Piso (1610–1678), Dutch doctor of medicine, together with Georg Marcgraf wrote the first book about the flora, fauna and the local customs of the Brazilians. Their book was and is a unique example of Brazilian society during the reign of the Dutch in Brazil. || 
|-id=241
| 11241 Eckhout || 6792 P-L || Albert Eckhout (1610–1666), Dutch painter who took part in an expedition to Brazil, made portraits of the people who inhabited Dutch Brazil during the reign of Johan Maurits, count of Nassau-Siegen in the 17th century. || 
|-id=242
| 11242 Franspost || 2144 T-1 || Frans Post (1612–1680), a Dutch painter who was one of the first European-trained artists to paint in the Americas. He recorded various aspects of life and the local atmosphere of Dutch Brazil, or Nieuw Holland, in his paintings. || 
|-id=243
| 11243 de Graauw || 2157 T-1 || Matthijs W. M. de Graauw (born 1942), a Dutch astronomer who is known for his tireless enthusiasm in pushing Dutch and European infrared and submillimeter astronomy forward, both on the ground and in space. || 
|-id=244
| 11244 Andrékuipers || 4314 T-2 || André Kuipers (born 1958), a Dutch physician and ESA astronaut who has had an inspiring role in promoting space among young people. || 
|-id=245
| 11245 Hansderijk || 3100 T-3 || Johannes A. F. de Rijk (born 1926) is a gifted Dutch science writer. Better known under the pseudonym Bruno Ernst, he has made contributions to astronomy, mathematics, physics, art and natural science, sundials and the art of M. C. Escher. || 
|-id=246
| 11246 Orvillewright || 4250 T-3 || Orville Wright (1871–1948), American aviator, generally credited with the assistance of his brother as being the first pilot of a heavier-than-air flying machine. || 
|-id=247
| 11247 Wilburwright || 4280 T-3 || Wilbur Wright (1867–1912), American aviator who participated with his brother in the first successful flights of a heavier-than-air flying machine at Kitty Hawk, North Carolina, on 17 December 1903. || 
|-id=248
| 11248 Blériot || 4354 T-3 || Louis Blériot (1872–1936), French aviator and airplane designer, made the first airplane crossing of the English Channel from France to England on 25 July 1909. || 
|-id=249
| 11249 Etna || 1971 FD || Mount Etna is a stratovolcano above the Sicilian city of Catania in Italy. Its height is 3350 meters, and the last eruption was 2003. Etna's eruptions have been known since antiquity. || 
|-id=251
| 11251 Icarion ||  || Icarion, from Greek mythology, the son of Ebalus of Sparta. By the nymph Periboea, Icarion was the father of Penelope. || 
|-id=252
| 11252 Laërtes ||  || Laërtes, king of Ithaca, was the son of Arcisius, who in turn was a son of Zeus. Laërtes was the husband of Anticleia and father of Odysseus. || 
|-id=253
| 11253 Mesyats ||  || Gennadij Andreevich Mesyats (born 1936), a Russian physicist. || 
|-id=254
| 11254 Konkohekisui ||  || Konko Hekisui (1909–1989) was a Japanese poet and sometime director of the library in Konko, Okayama prefecture. || 
|-id=255
| 11255 Fujiiekio ||  || Fujii Ekio (1910–1990), an amateur astronomer and sometime director of the Okayama Astronomy Museum. || 
|-id=256
| 11256 Fuglesang ||  || Christer Fuglesang, the first Swedish astronaut || 
|-id=257
| 11257 Rodionta ||  || Tatiana Vladimirovna Rodionova (born 1964) is an engineer in Orenburg, wife of Igor' Victorovich Rodionov, building engineer, and the discoverer's friend. || 
|-id=258
| 11258 Aoyama ||  || Aoyama Gakuin, a Christian educational institute founded in 1874, is the discoverer's Alma Mater. || 
|-id=259
| 11259 Yingtungchen ||  || Ying-Tung "Charles" Chen (born 1981) is a post-doctoral fellow at the Academia Sinica Institute of Astronomy and Astrophysics (Taiwan) where he uses data from large surveys to study outer solar system objects. || 
|-id=260
| 11260 Camargo ||  || Julio Ignacio Bueno de Camargo (born 1967) is a researcher at the Observatorio Nacional (Brazil) who specializes in astrometry of solar system bodies and reference frames, particularly in the prediction and observation of stellar occultations. || 
|-id=261
| 11261 Krisbecker || 1978 XK || Kris Jay Becker (born 1959), a senior computer scientist at the United States Geological Survey Astrogeology Science Center. || 
|-id=262
| 11262 Drube ||  || Line Drube (born 1980) is a postdoctoral researcher at the German Aerospace Center (DLR-Berlin) whose investigations include the thermal properties of asteroids and the properties of Martian airborne dust using data from the Phoenix Lander. || 
|-id=263
| 11263 Pesonen || 1979 OA || Lauri Pesonen (born 1944), an emeritus professor of geophysics at the University of Helsinki. || 
|-id=264
| 11264 Claudiomaccone ||  || Claudio Maccone (born 1948), Italian scientist at the Alenia Spazio in Turin, participant in the design of several scientific space missions (Src) || 
|-id=265
| 11265 Hasselmann ||  || Pedro Henrique Aragão Hasselmann (born 1987) completed his PhD at Observatório Nacional do Rio de Janeiro researching the photometric properties and phase functions of asteroids. || 
|-id=266
| 11266 Macke ||  || Robert J. Macke SJ (born 1974) is a research scientist and meteorite curator at the Vatican Observatory, whose fundamental contributions include studying the relationship between shock state and porosity in carbonaceous chondrites. || 
|-id=267
| 11267 Donaldkessler ||  || Donald J. Kessler (born 1940),  American astrophysicist and founder of the modern field of orbital debris, who was the head of NASA's orbital debris office || 
|-id=268
| 11268 Spassky ||  || Igor' Dmitrievich Spassky (born 1926), a specialist on shipbuilding and a great authority on creation of ice-resistant oil-and-gas production platforms and high-speed railway transport. He is an honored citizen of Saint Petersburg. || 
|-id=269
| 11269 Knyr ||  || Igor' Ivanovich Knyr (born 1963), an engineer and specialist on the introduction of new techniques in industry and a friend of the discoverer's family. || 
|-id=274
| 11274 Castillo-Rogez ||  || Julie Castillo-Rogez (born 1974) is a planetary scientist at the Jet Propulsion Laboratory who has performed extensive thermal and geochemical modeling of Ceres to interpret its interior structure based on Dawn Spacecraft data. || 
|-id=277
| 11277 Ballard ||  || Robert Ballard (born 1942), a marine scientist. || 
|-id=278
| 11278 Telesio ||  || Bernardino Telesio (1509–1588), an Italian philosopher and natural scientist. || 
|-id=280
| 11280 Sakurai ||  || Yukio Sakurai (born 1953), a local government official and an amateur astronomer in Japan. || 
|-id=282
| 11282 Hanakusa ||  || Kiyotaka Hanakusa (born 1956), director of the Seiwa Kogen Observatory since 1995, is an astronomy scholar and popularizer of astronomy in Kumamoto Prefecture. || 
|-id=284
| 11284 Belenus || 1990 BA || Belenus, husband of Belisana, is the Gaulish god of light, with responsibilities also to sheep and cattle. || 
|-id=288
| 11288 Okunohosomichi || 1990 XU || Oku no Hosomichi ("The Narrow Road to the Interior") is a Haikai travel journal written by Matsuo Basho, master Haikai poet, when he traveled the Northern Provinces of Honshu in 1689, accompanied by his apprentice Kawai Sora || 
|-id=289
| 11289 Frescobaldi ||  || Girolamo Frescobaldi, Italian composer. || 
|-id=292
| 11292 Bunjisuzuki ||  || Bunji Suzuki (born 1955), a high-school teacher and an amateur astrophysicist specializing in comets. || 
|-id=294
| 11294 Kazu || 1992 CK || Kazumasa Imai (born 1955) is a Japanese radio astronomer at Kochi National College of Technology. || 
|-id=295
| 11295 Gustaflarsson ||  || Carl Gustaf Larsson (1893–1985), born in Norrlanda, Gotland, was originally a carpenter but started to write poems in the local language spoken on Gotland. He is also well known for his photographs describing daily life on Gotland || 
|-id=296
| 11296 Denzen || 1992 KA || Aoudou Denzen (1748–1822) was a western-style painter of the Edo period born in Sukagawa in Oshu (now Sukagawa city, Fukushima prefecture). He was the first artist in Japan to perfect elaborate western-style copper plate engraving. The name was suggested by H. Sato. || 
|-id=298
| 11298 Gide ||  || André Gide (1869–1951), a French writer, humanist and moralist. || 
|-id=299
| 11299 Annafreud ||  || Anna Freud (1895–1982), the youngest daughter of Sigmund Freud, escaped with her father in 1938 Austria and settled in London. In 1936 she published Das Ich und die Abwehrmechanismen. She is considered the founder of child psychoanalysis. || 
|}

11301–11400 

|-id=302
| 11302 Rubicon ||  || The Rubicon (Latin Rubico) was a small river that separated ancient Cisalpine Gaul from Italy. || 
|-id=304
| 11304 Cowra || 1993 DJ || Cowra in New South Wales, Australia, is a tourist destination. || 
|-id=305
| 11305 Ahlqvist ||  || David Ahlqvist (1900–1988) was an artist, author, musician and for many years a leading personality in the cultural life on Gotland || 
|-id=306
| 11306 Åkesson ||  || Sonja Åkesson (1926–1977), born in Buttle on Gotland, was well known for her characteristic poetic style describing the struggles of daily life. She was also a songwriter || 
|-id=307
| 11307 Erikolsson ||  || Erik Olsson (1919–2007) was an artist who also worked with restoration of churches. He initiated the foundation of a museum in Kovik that reflects the history of fishing on Gotland || 
|-id=308
| 11308 Tofta ||  || Tofta is a parish on Gotland with one of the most popular beaches on the island. It is the site of a 47-m stoneship, the longest to be found on Gotland || 
|-id=309
| 11309 Malus ||  || Étienne-Louis Malus (1775–1812), a French physicist. || 
|-id=311
| 11311 Peleus ||  || Peleus, king of the Myrmidons in Thessaly, helped Heracles conquer Troy. He was married to the goddess Thetis. || 
|-id=313
| 11313 Kügelgen ||  || Gerhard von Kügelgen (1772–1820) and his son Wilhelm von Kügelgen (1802–1867), prominent German painters. || 
|-id=314
| 11314 Charcot ||  || Jean-Martin Charcot (1825–1893), one of France's greatest medical clinicians. || 
|-id=315
| 11315 Salpêtrière ||  || "Salpêtrière Hospital", a famous neurological clinic. || 
|-id=316
| 11316 Fuchitatsuo ||  || Tatsuo Fuchi (born 1952), a computer technology specialist and amateur astronomer. || 
|-id=317
| 11317 Hitoshi ||  || Hitoshi Hasegawa (born 1957), a computer programmer and an amateur planetary scientist. || 
|-id=321
| 11321 Tosimatumoto ||  || Tosikazu Matumoto (born 1941), a comet hunter in Takefu, Fukui prefecture. || 
|-id=322
| 11322 Aquamarine || 1995 QT || Aquamarine is the name of a Japanese duo group, Sachiko (born 1975) and Mimas (born 1971). They sing of stars and the universe. Their COSMOS is the main theme song of the "Star Week" event, produced by the National Astronomical Observatory of Japan. || 
|-id=323
| 11323 Nasu ||  || Eiichi Nasu (born 1955) was chief editor of the newsletter Astro Oita of the Astronomical Society of Oita for more than ten years, beginning in 1979. He is now the director of this society. || 
|-id=324
| 11324 Hayamizu ||  || Tsutomu Hayamizu (born 1962), associate director of the Sendai Space Hall and Observatory since 1997. || 
|-id=325
| 11325 Slavický || 1995 SG || Klement Slavický (1910–1999), an outstanding Czech composer. || 
|-id=326
| 11326 Ladislavschmied || 1995 SL || Ladislav Schmied (born 1927), a Czech amateur astronomer, known for his systematic observations of the sun. He has made more than 10,000 plots of the solar photosphere during the last 50 years. The name was suggested by P. Spurný. || 
|-id=328
| 11328 Mariotozzi || 1995 UL || Mario Tozzi, Italian geologist, author, and president of the Arcipelago Toscano National Park || 
|-id=332
| 11332 Jameswatt ||  || James Watt, Scottish mathematician and engineer. || 
|-id=333
| 11333 Forman || 1996 HU || Milos Forman (born 1932), a Czech films director.  || 
|-id=334
| 11334 Rio de Janeiro ||  || Rio de Janeiro, Brazil. || 
|-id=335
| 11335 Santiago ||  || Santiago, Chile. || 
|-id=336
| 11336 Piranesi ||  || Giambattista Piranesi, 18th-century Venetian architect and etcher, one of the main inspirers of neoclassicism || 
|-id=337
| 11337 Sandro ||  || Sandro Bartolini (born 1974), the elder son of the first discoverer. || 
|-id=338
| 11338 Schiele ||  || Egon Schiele, Austrian painter || 
|-id=339
| 11339 Orlík ||  || Orlík, castle in South Bohemia, Czech Republic || 
|-id=341
| 11341 Babbage ||  || Charles Babbage, a British mathematician. || 
|-id=348
| 11348 Allegra ||  || Allegra Noccioli (born 1999) is the daughter of Fabrizio Noccioli, an amateur astronomer in the Montelupo Group. || 
|-id=349
| 11349 Witten ||  || Edward Witten (born 1951), a physicist at the Institute for Advanced Study in Princeton and one of the premier theoretical physicists of our time. || 
|-id=350
| 11350 Teresa ||  || Teresa Chercoles (born 1951), wife of Rafael Pacheco, passes many nights at home while Pacheco and his colleagues are at the observatory enjoying the minor planets. || 
|-id=351
| 11351 Leucus ||  || Leucus, a character in Homer's Iliad, was an Achaean warrior and companion of Odysseus. || 
|-id=352
| 11352 Koldewey ||  || Eberhard Koldewey (born 1937), at the DLR Institute of Space Sensor Technology and Planetary Exploration, contributed to the upgrade of the Bochum telescope at the European Southern Observatory, where he participated in many observing campaigns on minor planets. The naming is on the occasion of his retirement. || 
|-id=353
| 11353 Guillaume ||  || Guillaume Scholl (born 1987) tested early versions of an automatic code for detecting minor planets developed by his father, astronomer Hans Scholl of the Observatoire de la Côte d´Azur. As a result, recent versions of the code are more user friendly. || 
|-id=356
| 11356 Chuckjones || 1997 YA || Charles Martin "Chuck" Jones, American animator, artist, screenwriter, producer, and director of animated films. || 
|-id=359
| 11359 Piteglio ||  || Piteglio, a village in Tuscany || 
|-id=360
| 11360 Formigine ||  || Formigine, a small Italian town located 10 km south of Modena. || 
|-id=361
| 11361 Orbinskij ||  || Artemij Robertovitch Orbinskij (1862–1927) was a Russian astronomer on the staff of the Odessa department of the Pulkovo Observatory. He made important contributions especially in the field of positional astronomy. The name was suggested by E. Kato || 
|-id=363
| 11363 Vives ||  || Juan Luis Vives (1492–1540), a Spanish humanist. || 
|-id=364
| 11364 Karlštejn ||  || The Gothic castle at Karlstejn was built in 1348 by Charles IV in the Kingdom of Bohemia, 27 km from the capital, Prague, to guard the crown jewels and state charters. The castle has survived well preserved to the present day, and it symbolizes Czech statehood within Europe. || 
|-id=365
| 11365 NASA ||  || NASA (the National Aeronautics and Space Administration). || 
|-id=369
| 11369 Brazelton ||  || Mary Augusta Brazelton (born 1986), an ISEF awardee in 2002 || 
|-id=370
| 11370 Nabrown ||  || Nachelle Diane Brown (born 1985), an ISEF awardee in 2002 || 
|-id=371
| 11371 Camley ||  || Brian Andrew Camley (born 1985), an ISEF awardee in 2002 || 
|-id=373
| 11373 Carbonaro ||  || Nicole Jean Carbonaro (born 1984), an ISEF awardee in 2002 || 
|-id=374
| 11374 Briantaylor ||  || Brian W. Taylor (born 1964), a Lowell Observatory instrumentation software specialist, designed the controller for LONEOS and other observatory CCD cameras. || 
|-id=376
| 11376 Taizomuta ||  || Taizo Muta (born 1937) is a physicist. His main interest is in the application of quantum field theory to particle physics. He is a discoverer of the MS-bar scheme in quantum chromodynamics. An amateur astronomer, he is currently serving as president of Hiroshima University. || 
|-id=377
| 11377 Nye ||  || Ralph A. Nye (born 1945), Lowell Observatory's instrument designer. || 
|-id=378
| 11378 Dauria ||  || Florida amateur astronomer Tippy D´Auria (born 1935) is founder of the Winter Star Party. || 
|-id=379
| 11379 Flaubert ||  || Gustave Flaubert, French author. || 
|-id=384
| 11384 Sartre ||  || Jean-Paul Sartre, French writer and philosopher. || 
|-id=385
| 11385 Beauvoir ||  || Simone de Beauvoir, French author, philosopher, and feminist. || 
|-id=392
| 11392 Paulpeeters ||  || Paul Peeters, Belgian amateur astronomer. || 
|-id=395
| 11395 Iphinous ||  || Iphinous, from Greek mythology. He was killed by Glaukos in hand-to-hand combat. || 
|-id=400
| 11400 Raša ||  || Raša river, Croatia || 
|}

11401–11500 

|-
| 11401 Pierralba ||  || Pierre Albanese (born 1992) showed a great interest in the sky, being able to recognize the major planets while he was only four years old. He made drawings inspired by the images obtained by his father, Caussols astronomer Dominique Albanese. || 
|-id=404
| 11404 Wittig ||  || Sigmar Wittig (born 1940), chairman of the Executive Board of the German Aerospace Center during 2002–2007, has been head of the Institute for Thermal Turbomachinery at the University of Karlsruhe, vice president of the German Research Foundation and chair of the European Space Agency Council. || 
|-id=406
| 11406 Ucciocontin ||  || Aurelio (Uccio) Contin (1923–2002) was a professional pharmacist, amateur scientist, diver and naturalist. He is well known for his educational and social work. || 
|-id=408
| 11408 Zahradník ||  || Rudolf Zahradník, Czech chemist, co-founder of the Czech school of quantum chemistry, founding father and first president of the Učená společnost České republiky (Learned Society of the Czech Republic), and first president of the Akademie věd České republiky (Academy of Sciences of the Czech Republic) || 
|-id=409
| 11409 Horkheimer ||  || Jack Horkheimer, American popularizer of astronomy † || 
|-id=413
| 11413 Catanach ||  || Therese Anne Catanach (born 1985), an ISEF awardee in 2002 || 
|-id=414
| 11414 Allanchu ||  || Allan Chu (born 1984), an ISEF awardee in 2002 || 
|-id=417
| 11417 Chughtai ||  || Asma Latif Chughtai (born 1986), an ISEF awardee in 2002 || 
|-id=419
| 11419 Donjohnson ||  || Donald Joe Johnson II (1959–2001) went from the field of aerospace to that of a testing engineer working towards the future. He was best known for his kindness, imagination and creativity in storytelling. In his stories he took friends and comrades to the stars in adventures with a brighter future for humanity. || 
|-id=421
| 11421 Cardano ||  || Gerolamo Cardano (1501–1576), prototypical Renaissance man, physician, mathematician, astrologer, inventor and gambler. || 
|-id=422
| 11422 Alilienthal ||  || Alfred Lilienthal (1889–1970) studied in England and was a businessman in Berlin during the 1930s. He spent the 1940s in Shanghai. || 
|-id=423
| 11423 Cronin ||  || Kevin Michael Cronin (born 1984), an ISEF awardee in 2002 || 
|-id=425
| 11425 Wearydunlop || 1999 MF || Sir Edward 'Weary' Dunlop, an Australian Army surgeon prisoner-of-war on the Burma railway. || 
|-id=426
| 11426 Molster || 2527 P-L || Lucia Glen Molster (26–27 April 2007) was the beloved daughter of Dutch astronomers Frank and Nathalie Molster. || 
|-id=427
| 11427 Willemkolff || 2611 P-L || Willem Johan Kolff, Dutch-born American internist, inventor of the kidney dialysis machine || 
|-id=428
| 11428 Alcinoös || 4139 P-L || Alcinous, King of Phaiacians and father of Nausicaa in Homer's Odyssey || 
|-id=429
| 11429 Demodokus || 4655 P-L || Demodocus, blind minstrel in Homer's Odyssey. || 
|-id=430
| 11430 Lodewijkberg || 9560 P-L || Lodewijk van den Berg, Dutch-born American astronaut || 
|-id=431
| 11431 Karelbosscha || 4843 T-1 || Karel Albert Rudolf Bosscha (1865–1928), a Dutch tea planter, co-founder of the Lembang Observatory near Bandung in the Dutch East Indies, uncle of Rudolf Albert Kerkhoven. || 
|-id=432
| 11432 Kerkhoven || 1052 T-2 || Rudolf Albert Kerkhoven (1879–1940) was a notable Dutch tea planter in Malabar, West Java, who, with his uncle Karel Albert Rudolf Bosscha, greatly contributed to the establishment of the Lembang Observatory. His legacy continues to support astronomical research in Indonesia and Holland. || 
|-id=433
| 11433 Gemmafrisius || 3474 T-3 || Gemma Frisius (a.k.a. Gemma Phrysius, Gemma Reyneri), 16th-century Dutch geographer, scientist, and physician, teacher of Mercator || 
|-id=434
| 11434 Lohnert ||  || Karl Lohnert (1885–1944) worked from 1905 to 1907 as an assistant of Max Wolf and discovered four now-numbered minor planets.
|-id=437
| 11437 Cardalda || 1971 SB || Carlos Cardalda (1883–1961), Argentine amateur astronomer, cofounder of the Argentinian Association of Amateur Astronomers and instrumental in founding the Asociación de Aficionados a la Astronomía Uruguay || 
|-id=438
| 11438 Zeldovich ||  || Yakov Borisovich Zel'dovich, Soviet physicist. || 
|-id=440
| 11440 Massironi ||  || Matteo Massironi (born 1967) is a professor at the University of Padova whose research includes the geology of (21) Lutetia and the surface layering of 67P/Churyumov-Gerasimenko using Rosetta spacecraft data. || 
|-id=441
| 11441 Anadiego || 1975 YD || Ana Teresa Diego, an outstanding undergraduate student at La Plata Astronomical. || 
|-id=442
| 11442 Seijin-Sanso ||  || Seijin-Sanso, near Kurashiki, Okayama prefecture, is the observing station where famed comet and nova hunter Minoru Honda discovered four of his 12 novae. He was observing there in 1990 on the last night of his life. || 
|-id=443
| 11443 Youdale || 1977 CP || Jack Youdale (1932–2017) was a British amateur astronomer, telescope maker and public outreach advocate. He was Honorary President of the Cleveland and Darlington Astronomical Society from 1979 until his death, and he had a monthly astronomy slot on local radio for over 20 years. || 
|-id=444
| 11444 Peshekhonov ||  || Vladimir Grigor'evich Peshekhonov (born 1934), director of the Central Scientific Research Institute "Electropribor", St. Petersburg, is a prominent specialist in naval and space navigation. He has developed a number of high-precision inertial navigation systems for sea vessels and mobile gravimeters for use on the sea shelf. || 
|-id=445
| 11445 Fedotov ||  || Victor Andreevich Fedotov (1933–2001), the brilliant conductor of performances in Mariinskij Theatre for more than 35 years. || 
|-id=446
| 11446 Betankur ||  || Avgustin Avgustinovich Betankur (1758–1824), a civil engineer who built a gun foundry in Kazan, many bridges and several remarkable buildings, in particular a riding-house in Moscow. || 
|-id=448
| 11448 Miahajduková ||  || Mária (Mia) Hajduková Jr. (born 1967) is a research scientist at the Slovak Academy of Science investigating meteoroid orbits, particularly the critical analysis of observational errors leading to apparently hyperbolic orbits. || 
|-id=449
| 11449 Stephwerner || 1979 QP || Stephanie C. Werner (born 1974), a German geophysicist, has investigated the chronostratigraphy and geologic evolutionary history of Mars. || 
|-id=450
| 11450 Shearer ||  || Andrew Shearer (born 1953) an astrophysicist and professor at NUI Galway in Ireland, leads the group working in the field of high-time-resolution astrophysics and image processing. He was responsible for the measurements of the pulsed optical emission from PSR B0656+14 and Geminga (Src). || 
|-id=451
| 11451 Aarongolden ||  || Aaron Golden (born 1969), of the National University of Ireland, Galway, works in the field of high-time resolution astrophysics and image processing. He participated in the discovery of optical pulsations from two pulsars. || 
|-id=453
| 11453 Cañada-Assandri ||  || Marcela Cañada-Assandri (born 1976) is an astronomer at the El Leoncito Observatory in San Juan, Argentina, where she has worked on polarimetry of main-belt asteroids and the dynamics of the Hungaria group. || 
|-id=454
| 11454 Mariomelita ||  || Mario Daniel Melita (born 1964) is a professor at the Instituto de Astronomía y Física del Espacio (IAFE) of the Universidad de Buenos Aires, specializing in dynamical and physical properties of small solar system bodies. || 
|-id=455
| 11455 Richardstarr ||  || Richard Starr (born 1950) of the Catholic University of America is an expert in planetary X-ray, gamma-ray, and neutron spectroscopy, including their application to asteroid missions. || 
|-id=456
| 11456 Cotto-Figueroa ||  || Desiree Cotto-Figueroa (born 1984) is a professor at the University of Puerto Rico, Humacao whose research includes shape and spin evolution of near-Earth asteroids in response to re-radiation of solar flux. || 
|-id=457
| 11457 Hitomikobayashi ||  || Hitomi Kobayashi (born 1984) is a Japanese researcher who studies formation and evolution of cometary organic volatiles based on observations and laboratory experiments. || 
|-id=458
| 11458 Rosemarypike ||  || Rosemary E. Pike (born 1984) is a postdoctoral fellow at the Institute of Astronomy and Astrophysics, Academia Sinica (Taiwan) who studies complex resonances in the Kuiper belt, particularly the stability of the 5:1 resonance with Neptune. || 
|-id=459
| 11459 Andráspál ||  || András Pál (born 1981) is a researcher at the Konkoly Observatory in Budapest who develops computer tools for the processing and interpretation of small body visual and infrared observations. || 
|-id=460
| 11460 Juliafang ||  || Julia Fang (born 1987) completed her PhD work at UCLA using observational data and numerical integrations in the dynamical study of multiple asteroid systems, both in the near-Earth and main belt populations. || 
|-id=461
| 11461 Wladimirneumann ||  || Wladimir Neumann (born 1981) is a researcher at the German Aerospace Center (DLR-Berlin) who studies water-rock differentiation of icy bodies applicable to interpreting Ceres data from the Dawn mission. || 
|-id=462
| 11462 Hsingwenlin ||  || Hsing-Wen "Edward" Lin (born 1982) is a postdoctoral researcher at the National Central University of Taiwan whose research spans from trans-Neptunian objects, to Centaurs, Neptune Trojans and main-belt asteroids. || 
|-id=463
| 11463 Petrpokorny ||  || Petr Pokorný (born 1986) is a Czech astrophysicist specializing in numerical models of the solar system dust complex and observational interpretation of meteor radar measurements. || 
|-id=464
| 11464 Moser ||  || Danielle Moser (born 1980) is a scientist working for the NASA Meteoroid Environment Office whose research includes meteor shower forecasting and estimating the energies of lunar impactors. || 
|-id=465
| 11465 Fulvio ||  || Daniele Fulvio (born 1979) is a professor of physics at the Pontificia Universidade Católica do Rio de Janeiro performing laboratory simulation of asteroid space weathering through ion irradiation of meteorite samples. || 
|-id=466
| 11466 Katharinaotto ||  || Katharina A. Otto (born 1984) is a scientist at the German Aerospace Center (DLR-Berlin) studying the effects of Coriolis force in shaping surface features on Vesta through analysis of Dawn spacecraft images. || 
|-id=467
| 11467 Simonporter ||  || Simon B. Porter (born 1984) is a postdoctoral researcher at Southwest Research Institute (Boulder, Colorado) whose studies include tidal dissipation and stability in trans-Neptunian binary systems. || 
|-id=468
| 11468 Shantanunaidu ||  || Shantanu Naidu (born 1985) is a postdoctoral researcher at the Jet Propulsion Laboratory who combines dynamical theory and radar observations for asteroid physical studies, including spin-orbit coupling interactions in binary asteroid systems. || 
|-id=469
| 11469 Rozitis ||  || Benjamin Rozitis (born 1984) is a research fellow at the Open University (UK) studying the physical and dynamical characterization of asteroid surfaces through spacecraft data, modeling, and microgravity experiments. || 
|-id=470
| 11470 Davidminton ||  || David Minton (born 1976) is a professor at Purdue University investigating the dynamical history of the main asteroid belt and its connection with terrestrial impacts. || 
|-id=471
| 11471 Toshihirabayashi ||  || Masatoshi Hirabayashi (born 1983) is a postdoctoral researcher at Purdue University specializing in modeling structural stresses experienced by rotating asteroids and comet nuclei. || 
|-id=473
| 11473 Barbaresco || 1982 SC || Barbaresco is a beautiful little Italian town in the Langhe region of Piedmont. || 
|-id=475
| 11475 Velinský || 1982 VL || Jaroslav Velinský (1932–2012), nickname Kapitán Kid, was a Czech science fiction and detective novel writer, publisher, songwriter and musician. He was one of the founders of the Czech folk festival, Porta. || 
|-id=476
| 11476 Stefanosimoni ||  || Stefano Simoni (born 1974) is an Italian amateur astronomer. He created and maintains a very popular non-profit Italian blog devoted to the dissemination of astronomy and astrophysics. || 
|-id=480
| 11480 Velikij Ustyug ||  || Veliky Ustyug, Russia. || 
|-id=481
| 11481 Znannya ||  || Znannya, a scientific society founded in Kyiv in 1948 by Ukrainian astronomer Sergej Konstantinovich Vsekhsvyatskij and other scientists. It propagates knowledge in astronomy, physics, history and other sciences in Ukraine and elsewhere. || 
|-id=484
| 11484 Daudet ||  || Alphonse Daudet (1840–1897), a French novelist who is remembered as a writer of sentimental tales, believed that the world was misrepresented by novelists, who concentrated only on its uglier aspects. His Lettres de mon Moulin (1869) can therefore be considered a more joyful interpretation of the mystery of things and of individuals. || 
|-id=485
| 11485 Zinzendorf ||  || Nikolaus Ludwig, Graf von Zinzendorf (1700–1760), a counsellor at the court of his native town of Dresden (1721–1727). || 
|-id=492
| 11492 Shimose ||  || Nobuo Shimose (born 1944) is well known in Yamaguchi prefecture as a professional cameraman of the first order, as well as an amateur astronomer. He is also the leader of the Yamaguchi Astronomical Society and the Hagi Astronomical Club. || 
|-id=494
| 11494 Hibiki ||  || The Sea of Hibiki, an open-sea region between the Fukuoka and Yamaguchi prefectures. The asteroid's name was selected from candidates proposed by children who attended the Fureai Space Festival, held in the city of Kitakyushu on the Japanese Space Day in 2005 (also see citation for 11933 Himuka). || 
|-id=495
| 11495 Fukunaga || 1988 XR || Yasutoshi Fukunaga (born 1951) is a well-known amateur astronomer in Yamaguchi prefecture, the site of frequent star parties. He is the head of the astronomy club in his home in the Syunan area. || 
|-id=496
| 11496 Grass ||  || Günter Grass (1927–2015), a German writer, sculptor and graphic artist, is a critic of both the immediate postwar years and the present. His passionate writing received only partial recognition in Germany but great acclaim elsewhere. He won the 1999 Nobel Prize for literature. || 
|-id=498
| 11498 Julgeerts ||  || Julien Armand Geerts (born 1909) is a well-known commercial artist in Belgium. He was for many years a good friend of the discoverer's parents. || 
|-id=499
| 11499 Duras || 1989 RL || Marguerite Duras (1914–1996), was a French novelist who became internationally known for the screenplay of Hiroshima mon amour (1959). Her semi-autobiographical novel L'Amant was nominated for the Prix Goncourt in 1984. || 
|-id=500
| 11500 Tomaiyowit || 1989 UR || Tomaiyowit, Earth Mother in the Luiseno creation story; together with Tukmit, she gave birth to the First People || 
|}

11501–11600 

|-id=504
| 11504 Kazo || 1990 BT || Kazo, a Japanese city in Saitama prefecture, near Tokyo || 
|-id=506
| 11506 Toulouse-Lautrec ||  || Henri de Toulouse-Lautrec (1864–1901), a French painter || 
|-id=507
| 11507 Danpascu || 1990 OF || Dan Pascu (born 1938), astronomer and astrometrist U.S. Naval Observatory, who he rediscovered and co-discovered Janus and Calypso, two moons of Saturn, respectively || 
|-id=508
| 11508 Stolte ||  || Dieter Stolte (born 1934) served for 20 years as director general of ZDF, the public German TV net and one of the largest European TV stations. A professor of media research, Stolte initiated international TV channels (ARTE, 3SAT) in a European cooperation. || 
|-id=509
| 11509 Thersilochos ||  || Thersilochus, a Trojan warrior from the rich valleys of Paeonia. He showed up, together with Hector, at the battle for the dead body of Patrocles, and was later killed by Achilles. || 
|-id=510
| 11510 Borges ||  || Jorge Luis Borges (1899–1986), an Argentine poet and short-story writer || 
|-id=514
| 11514 Tsunenaga ||  || Hasekura Tsunenaga (1571–1622), who, in 1613, led the first Japanese mission across the Pacific to the Americas (in Mexico), and he continued across the Atlantic to Europe, where he met with king Philip III of Spain and pope Paul V. His portrait was designated a national treasure for the first time in Sendai in June 2001. || 
|-id=515
| 11515 Oshijyo ||  || Oshijyo, the symbol of Gyoda Ichi, is located in the central part of that city and dates from the Muromachi period || 
|-id=516
| 11516 Arthurpage || 1991 ED || Arthur Page (born 1922), an Australian astronomer and founder of the Astronomical Association of Queensland || 
|-id=517
| 11517 Esteracuna ||  || Maria Ester Acuna Castillo (born 1951), a longtime caretaker at the Manuel Foster Observatory in Santiago, Chile || 
|-id=518
| 11518 Jung ||  || Carl Gustav Jung (1875–1961), a Swiss psychiatrist || 
|-id=519
| 11519 Adler ||  || Alfred Adler (1870–1937), an Austrian physician and psychiatrist || 
|-id=520
| 11520 Fromm ||  || Erich Fromm (1900–1980), a German psychoanalyst || 
|-id=521
| 11521 Erikson ||  || Erik H. Erikson (1902–1994), a German-American psychoanalyst. || 
|-id=524
| 11524 Pleyel ||  || Ignaz Pleyel (1757–1831), an Austrian-born French composer and piano builder || 
|-id=528
| 11528 Mie || 1991 XH || Mie Nagata (born 1963), a lecturer at the Gotoh Planetarium and Astronomical Museum in Tokyo from 1988 to 1994 || 
|-id=530
| 11530 d'Indy ||  || Vincent d'Indy (1851–1931), a French composer || 
|-id=532
| 11532 Gullin ||  || Lars Gullin (1928–1976), a Swedish jazz musician and composer, known for his style of playing the baritone saxophone || 
|-id=533
| 11533 Akebäck ||  || Akebäck, a small socken located on the Swedish island of Gotland || 
|-id=537
| 11537 Guericke ||  || Otto von Guericke (1602–1686), a German physicist and inventor of the air pump and centrifuge || 
|-id=538
| 11538 Brunico ||  || Bruneck (Brunico), an Italian town in South Tirol || 
|-id=542
| 11542 Solikamsk ||  || Solikamsk, a Russian city in the Perm region near the Ural Mountains || 
|-id=545
| 11545 Hashimoto ||  || Kunihiko Hashimoto (born 1951), a Japanese amateur astronomer and member of the Fukuoka Astronomical Society || 
|-id=546
| 11546 Miyoshimachi ||  || Miyoshi, a Japanese town located in Saitama Prefecture || 
|-id=547
| 11547 Griesser ||  || Markus Griesser (born 1949), a Swiss amateur astronomer at Eschenberg Observatory || 
|-id=548
| 11548 Jerrylewis ||  || Jerry Lewis (born 1926), an American comedian || 
|-id=552
| 11552 Boucolion ||  || Boucolion a character from Greek mythology. He is the father of the Trojan warriors Pedasos and Aesopos, who both died near the River Scamander. || 
|-id=553
| 11553 Scheria ||  || Scheria (Corfu), one of the Greek Ionian islands, which was first mentioned in Homer's Odyssey || 
|-id=554
| 11554 Asios ||  || Asios, a Trojan warrior and one of the leaders in the assault on the Greek wall. He challenged Idomeneos and was killed by him. || 
|-id=569
| 11569 Virgilsmith ||  || The design and construction abilities of Virgil Smith (born 1941), of Corona, Arizona, have resulted in the successful completion of the Jarnac Observatory, located at the home of the second discoverer. || 
|-id=571
| 11571 Daens ||  || Adolf Daens (1839–1907), a Flemish priest from Aalst, Belgium || 
|-id=572
| 11572 Schindler ||  || Oskar Schindler (1905–1974), a German industrialist || 
|-id=573
| 11573 Helmholtz ||  || Hermann von Helmholtz (1821–1894), a German doctor, physiologist and physicist. || 
|-id=574
| 11574 d'Alviella ||  || Eugène Goblet d'Alviella (1846–1925), a senator of Belgium, lawyer, Professor of the history of religions, and rector of the Universite Libre de Bruxelles || 
|-id=575
| 11575 Claudio ||  || Claudio Deponte (born 1960), an Italian amateur astronomer and long-term secretary of the astronomical society at the Farra d'Isonzo Observatory (Circolo Culturale Astronomico di Farra d'Isonzo). || 
|-id=577
| 11577 Einasto ||  || Jaan Einasto (born 1929), and Estonian astronomer and one of the discoverers of dark matter || 
|-id=578
| 11578 Cimabue || 1994 EB || Cimabue (1240–1302), an Italian painter and designer of mosaics from Florence || 
|-id=579
| 11579 Tsujitsuka || 1994 JN || Takashi Tsujitsuka (born 1961), a Japanese elementary school teacher and amateur astronomer. His main interests lie in observing stellar occultations at his private observatory, where he also indulges in his favorite pastime of polishing mirrors for reflecting telescopes. || 
|-id=580
| 11580 Bautzen ||  || Bautzen, a German town in eastern Saxony || 
|-id=581
| 11581 Philipdejager ||  || Philip de Jager (born 1969), a Belgian percussionist || 
|-id=582
| 11582 Bleuler ||  || Eugen Bleuler (1857–1939), Swiss psychiatrist || 
|-id=583
| 11583 Breuer ||  || Jozef Breuer (1842–1925), an Austrian physician || 
|-id=584
| 11584 Ferenczi ||  || Sándor Ferenczi (1873–1933), a Hungarian psychoanalyst || 
|-id=585
| 11585 Orlandelassus ||  || Orlande de Lassus (1532–1594), a Franco-Flemish composer || 
|-id=588
| 11588 Gottfriedkeller ||  || Gottfried Keller (1819–1890), a Swiss author || 
|-id=592
| 11592 Clintkelly ||  || Clint Kelly, senior vice president for Advanced Technology Development at Science Applications International Corporation since 1988. || 
|-id=593
| 11593 Uchikawa || 1995 HK || Yoshihisa Uchikawa (born 1947) is one of the leading amateur astronomers from Saga prefecture and the Kyushu district. || 
|-id=595
| 11595 Monsummano || 1995 KN || Monsummano Terme, an Italian village in Northern Tuscany || 
|-id=596
| 11596 Francetic ||  || Daniel Francetic (1933–2014), American director and space science educator of the Euclid High School Planetarium in Euclid, Ohio. Past president of the Great Lakes Planetarium Association and founding member of the Cleveland Regional Association of Planetariums, his passion for teaching astronomy touched innumerable students || 
|-id=598
| 11598 Kubík || 1995 OJ || Jakub Šaroun (born 1974), brother of Czech discoverer Lenka Kotková || 
|-id=600
| 11600 Cipolla ||  || Carlo Cipolla (born 1925), an Italian chemist and amateur astronomer || 
|}

11601–11700 

|-id=602
| 11602 Miryang ||  || Miryang, South Korea, birthplace of the discovery team leader's wife, Chung-hi Koh (Helen) Weber || 
|-id=604
| 11604 Novigrad ||  || Novigrad, also known as Novigrad Istarski and Cittanova d'Istria, a town and a municipality in Istria, Croatia. The city is located close to the mouth of the river Mirna, on a small island that was connected with the mainland in the eighteenth century. || 
|-id=605
| 11605 Ranfagni ||  || Piero Ranfagni (born 1949) worked for many years as a technician at Arcetri Astrophysical Observatory. He is on the technical staff of the TIRGO Telescope and in the project office of  LBT. He has also been very active in the history of astronomy and in popular astronomy. || 
|-id=606
| 11606 Almary ||  || Alfred and Mary Tholen, the parents of the discoverer, David Tholen, on the occasion of their 50th wedding anniversary. || 
|-id=612
| 11612 Obu ||  || The Japanese city of Ōbu, located in the center of Aichi Prefecture, where the discoverer Akimasa Nakamura lived for six and a half years. || 
|-id=614
| 11614 Istropolitana ||  || Universitas Istropolitana in Bratislava, was the first university in present-day Slovakia and an ancient predecessor of Comenius University. || 
|-id=615
| 11615 Naoya ||  || Naoya Matsumoto (born 1952) is a Japanese amateur astronomer and president of the Nagasaki Astronomical Society. || 
|-id=620
| 11620 Susanagordon ||  || Susana Gordon (born 1958) has dedicated most of her adult life as a dialysis caregiver at the Good Samaritan Hospital in New York. She moved to Tucson, Arizona, in the late 1990s, where she is a massage therapist. Her interests include gems and minerals, photography and dancing || 
|-id=621
| 11621 Duccio ||  || Duccio Bartolini (born 1976) is the younger son of the first discoverer. || 
|-id=622
| 11622 Samuele ||  || Samuele Marconi (born 1975), an active Italian amateur astronomer at the San Marcello Observatory who spends much of his time giving public lectures on astronomy. at the Pistoia Mountains Astronomical Observatory in San Marcello Pistoiese. || 
|-id=623
| 11623 Kagekatu ||  || Kagekatu Uesugi (1555–1623) was a military commander during the Japanese feudal period. He was lord of Echigo Kasugayama castle from 1578, of Mutu Aizu castle from 1598 and of Dewa Yonezawa castle from 1601. || 
|-id=625
| 11625 Francelinda ||  || Francesca and Linda Tesi, granddaughters of the co-discoverer Luciano Tesi || 
|-id=626
| 11626 Church Stretton ||  || The small town of Church Stretton is set amidst the South Shropshire hills of western England. It is the location of the Church Stretton Observatory, where this minor planet was discovered. || 
|-id=628
| 11628 Katuhikoikeda ||  || Katuhiko Ikeda (born 1958) is a Japanese amateur astronomer and professional engineer. As a developer and repairer of electrical devices, he helps maintain the Moriyama Observatory . || 
|-id=636
| 11636 Pezinok ||  || Pezinok, a small town near Bratislava. || 
|-id=637
| 11637 Yangjiachi ||  || Yang Jiachi (1919–2016), an expert in automatic control and space technology, devoted himself to the development of artificial earth satellites in China. || 
|-id=652
| 11652 Johnbrownlee ||  || John W. Brownlee (born 1973) was the system administrator, principal programmer and an observer on the Catalina Sky Survey team during 1998–2000.Src || 
|-id=656
| 11656 Lipno ||  || The Lipno dam in South Bohemia, Czech Republic. It was built on the Vltava river in 1959 as the largest Czechoslovak dam. It is important for the water supply, as a source of power and also as a well-known South Bohemian holiday area. || 
|-id=657
| 11657 Antonhajduk ||  || Anton Hajduk (born 1933) is a professor of astronomy at the Slovak Academy of Sciences. His research centers on the structure of meteor streams and radio studies of meteor head echoes and the secondary ozone layer. || 
|-id=664
| 11664 Kashiwagi ||  || Shuji Kashiwagi (born 1952) is a junior high school teacher and associate president of the Astronomical Society of Oita. || 
|-id=665
| 11665 Dirichlet ||  || Peter Gustav Lejeune Dirichlet (1805–1859) was the successor of Gauss and the predecessor of Riemann at Göttingen. He made important contributions in both pure and applied mathematics and gave the first rigorous proof of the convergence of Fourier series. || 
|-id=666
| 11666 Bracker ||  || Steve Bracker (born 1942) is a renaissance man – particle physicist, harpsichordist, astronomer, naturalist and software guru. The very first programmer with the Cerro Tololo Inter-American Observatory in Chile, he continued his involvement in astronomy with the Sloan Digital Sky Survey. || 
|-id=667
| 11667 Testa ||  || Augusto Testa (born 1950), Italian amateur astronomer and discoverer of minor planets at the Sormano Astronomical Observatory in northern Italy. Over the past few years he has developed a lot of software dedicated to the observation of minor planets, and these are widely used by the Italian community of astrometric observers. || 
|-id=668
| 11668 Balios ||  || Balius (in Latin: Balios) was one of the two immortal horses of the Greek hero Achilles who took them to draw his chariot during the Trojan War. || 
|-id=669
| 11669 Pascalscholl ||  || Pascal Scholl (born 1994) is the younger son of astronomer Hans Scholl. || 
|-id=670
| 11670 Fountain ||  || Glen Harold Fountain (born 1942) is the project manager of the New Horizons Pluto Kuiper Belt mission. || 
|-id=672
| 11672 Cuney ||  || Husband and wife team Bruce (born 1947) and Dana (born 1950) Cuney work at Palomar and were responsible for the remodeling of the old 1.2-m Schmidt dome interior. || 
|-id=673
| 11673 Baur ||  || Johann M. Baur (1930–2007), was a German amateur astronomer, discoverer of minor planets and founder of the Chaonis Observatory  in northern Italy. || 
|-id=675
| 11675 Billboyle ||  || William Boyle (born 1924), co-invented the CCD while at Bell Laboratories in 1969. || 
|-id=678
| 11678 Brevard ||  || Brevard County, Florida. || 
|-id=679
| 11679 Brucebaker ||  || Bruce Baker (1949-2021), fabricated and installed the mechanical portions of the slip rings and assisted in the fabrication of many small mechanical assemblies needed throughout the upgrade of the 1.2-m Schmidt at Palomar. || 
|-id=681
| 11681 Ortner ||  || Johannes Ortner (born 1933) is founder and unique director of the Summer School Alpbach. Held annually since 1975, Alpbach provides in-depth teaching on all aspects of space science and technology for European students, culminating in the design of innovative space-mission proposals. || 
|-id=682
| 11682 Shiwaku ||  || Hideaki Shiwaku (born 1963) is one of promoters of the Matsue Astronomical Club, an amateur astronomers group in the Matsue area of Japan, and a good friend of the discoverer, Hiroshi Abe. || 
|-id=685
| 11685 Adamcurry ||  || Adam Michael Curry (born 1984), an ISEF awardee in 2002 || 
|-id=688
| 11688 Amandugan ||  || Amanda Dyann Dugan (born 1986), an ISEF awardee in 2002 || 
|-id=690
| 11690 Carodulaney ||  || Caroline Ann DuLaney (born 1985), an ISEF awardee in 2002 || 
|-id=691
| 11691 Easterwood ||  || Jeffrey Michael Easterwood (born 1985), an ISEF awardee in 2002 || 
|-id=693
| 11693 Grantelliott ||  || Grant A. Elliott (born 1984), an ISEF awardee in 2002 || 
|-id=694
| 11694 Esterhuysen ||  || Stephanus Albertus Esterhuysen (born 1983), an ISEF awardee in 2002 || 
|-id=695
| 11695 Mattei ||  || Janet Akyüz Mattei (1943–2004), was a Turkish–American astronomer and promoter of the observation of variable stars by amateurs, and long-time director of the American Association of Variable Star Observers from 1973 to 2004. || 
|-id=696
| 11696 Capen ||  || Charles ("Chick") Franklin Capen (1926–1986) was best known for his observations of the planets, particularly Mars. || 
|-id=697
| 11697 Estrella ||  || Allan Noriel Estrella (born 1984), an ISEF awardee in 2002 || 
|-id=698
| 11698 Fichtelman ||  || Jon Roger Fichtelman (born 1986), an ISEF awardee in 2002 || 
|}

11701–11800 

|-id=702
| 11702 Mifischer ||  || Michael Henry Fischer (born 1985), an ISEF awardee in 2002 || 
|-id=703
| 11703 Glassman ||  || Elena Leah Glassman (born 1986), an ISEF awardee in 2002 || 
|-id=704
| 11704 Gorin ||  || Michael Adam Gorin (born 1985), an ISEF awardee in 2002 || 
|-id=706
| 11706 Rijeka ||  || Rijeka, the principal seaport of Croatia, located on Kvarner Bay, an inlet of the Adriatic Sea. || 
|-id=707
| 11707 Grigery ||  || Chelsea Nicole Grigery (born 1986), an ISEF awardee in 2002 || 
|-id=709
| 11709 Eudoxos ||  || Eudoxos of Knidos (c. 408-355 B.C.) was the prime mover behind two major developments in Greek mathematical thought: the theory of proportions that overcame the crisis caused by the discovery of irrational numbers, and the method of exhaustion for the calculation of areas and volumest. || 
|-id=710
| 11710 Nataliehale ||  || Natalie Adele Hale (born 1986), an ISEF awardee in 2002 || 
|-id=711
| 11711 Urquiza ||  || Luis Urquiza del Valle (1906–2000) was the much-loved grandfather of LONEOS observer L. Levy. || 
|-id=712
| 11712 Kemcook ||  || Kem H. Cook (born 1949), of Lawrence Livermore National Laboratory, is a founding member of the Massive Compact Halo Objects (MACHO) Project, which used a refurbished, 120-year-old telescope (The Great Melbourne Telescope) to survey the Magellanic Clouds for gravitational microlensing by baryonic, halo dark matter. || 
|-id=713
| 11713 Stubbs ||  || Christopher Stubbs (born 1958), of the University of Washington, has pursued a variety of projects in experimental physics and observational astrophysics, including searching for dark matter, measuring the rate of expansion of the universe with supernovae and testing the equivalence principle. || 
|-id=714
| 11714 Mikebrown ||  || Michael E. Brown (born 1965), assistant professor of astronomy at the California Institute of Technology. || 
|-id=715
| 11715 Harperclark ||  || Elizabeth Dee Pauline Harper-Clark (born 1984), an ISEF awardee in 2002 || 
|-id=716
| 11716 Amahartman ||  || Amanda Nicole Hartman (born 1987), an ISEF awardee in 2002 || 
|-id=718
| 11718 Hayward ||  || Nicholas Mark Edward Alexander Hayward (born 1984), an ISEF awardee in 2002 || 
|-id=719
| 11719 Hicklen ||  || Rachel Scarlett Hicklen (born 1984), an ISEF awardee in 2002 || 
|-id=720
| 11720 Horodyskyj ||  || Ulyana N. Horodyskyj (born 1986), an ISEF awardee in 2002 || 
|-id=724
| 11724 Ronaldhsu ||  || Ronald Hsu (born 1985), an ISEF awardee in 2002 || 
|-id=725
| 11725 Victoriahsu ||  || Victoria Hsu (born 1987), an ISEF awardee in 2002 || 
|-id=726
| 11726 Edgerton || 1998 JA || Harold "Doc" Eugene Edgerton (1903–1990), born in Fremont, Nebraska, was professor of electrical engineering at the Massachusetts Institute of Technology during 1928–1966. || 
|-id=727
| 11727 Sweet ||  || During the 1.2-m Schmidt conversion Merle Sweet (born 1942), assistant superintendent at the Palomar Observatory, assisted in overseeing the details in the layout and construction of the slip-ring trolleys. He also worked in the rewiring of the dome. || 
|-id=728
| 11728 Einer ||  || Steve Einer (born 1955), a Palomar Observatory technician. || 
|-id=730
| 11730 Yanhua ||  || Yan Hua (born 1984), an ISEF awardee in 2002 || 
|-id=736
| 11736 Viktorfischl ||  || Viktor Fischl Avigdor Dagan (born 1912) is a frequently translated Czech-Israeli writer who put ethical values into literature through his stylistic and linguistic mastery, in which he emphasizes responsibility for interpersonal relations, love, tolerance and respect. || 
|-id=739
| 11739 Baton Rouge ||  || Baton Rouge, Louisiana. || 
|-id=740
| 11740 Georgesmith ||  || George Smith (born 1930) co-invented the CCD while at Bell Laboratories in 1969. || 
|-id=743
| 11743 Jachowski ||  || Matthew Douglas Apau Jachowski (born 1985), an ISEF awardee in 2002 || 
|-id=746
| 11746 Thomjansen ||  || Thomas Scott Jansen (born 1986), an ISEF awardee in 2002 || 
|-id=752
| 11752 Masatakesagai ||  || Masatake Sagai (born 1950) became a member of the Nanyo Astronomical Club in 1985 and is an active popularizer of astronomy. || 
|-id=753
| 11753 Geoffburbidge || 2064 P-L || Geoffrey Ronald Burbidge, British-American physicist. || 
|-id=754
| 11754 Herbig || 2560 P-L || George Herbig (1920–2013), American astronomer and co-discoverer of the Herbig–Haro objects || 
|-id=755
| 11755 Paczynski || 2691 P-L || Bohdan Paczyński, Polish astronomer. || 
|-id=756
| 11756 Geneparker || 2779 P-L || Eugene Parker (1927–2022), American astronomer. || 
|-id=757
| 11757 Salpeter || 2799 P-L || Edwin Ernest Salpeter, Austrian astronomer. || 
|-id=758
| 11758 Sargent || 4035 P-L || Wallace Sargent, a British astrophysicist. || 
|-id=759
| 11759 Sunyaev || 4075 P-L || Rashid Sunyaev, Uzbek astrophysicist. || 
|-id=760
| 11760 Auwers || 4090 P-L || Arthur Auwers (Georg Friedrich Julius Arthur von Auwers), 19th–20th-century German astronomer, director of the Potsdam Observatory from 1881, author of the first reference catalogue of fundamental star positions || 
|-id=761
| 11761 Davidgill || 4868 P-L || David Gill, 19th–20th-century British astronomer and instrument designer, director of the Cape Observatory || 
|-id=762
| 11762 Vogel || 6044 P-L || Hermann Carl Vogel (1841–1907) was a German astronomer and spectroscopist. He invented an early scheme to classify stellar spectra and confirmed the sun's rotation. He directed the Potsdam Astrophysical Observatory from 1882 to 1907. || 
|-id=763
| 11763 Deslandres || 6303 P-L || Henri-Alexandre Deslandres (1853–1948) was a French astrophysicist and observatory director. An independent inventor of the spectroheliograph, he investigated molecular spectra in the laboratory and observed the solar chromosphere. || 
|-id=764
| 11764 Benbaillaud || 6531 P-L || Édouard Benjamin Baillaud19th–20th-century French director of the Toulouse (1878–1907) and Paris (1907–1926) observatories, founder of the Observatoire du Pic du Midi, first president of the International Astronomical Union || 
|-id=765
| 11765 Alfredfowler || 9057 P-L || Alfred Fowler, 19th–20th-century British astrophysicist, first general secretary of the International Astronomical Union || 
|-id=766
| 11766 Fredseares || 9073 P-L || Frederick H. Seares, 19th–20th-century American astronomer, standardizer of the stellar magnitude system || 
|-id=767
| 11767 Milne || 3224 T-1 || E. Arthur Milne, 20th-century British mathematician and astrophysicist || 
|-id=768
| 11768 Merrill || 4107 T-1 || Paul W. Merrill, 20th-century American spectroscopist, first to detect a short-lived isotope of technetium in the atmospheres of stars, thus confirming stellar nucleosynthesis || 
|-id=769
| 11769 Alfredjoy || 2199 T-2 || Alfred H. Joy, 20th-century American astronomer, inventor of the T Tauri classification || 
|-id=770
| 11770 Rudominkowski || 3163 T-2 || Rudolph Minkowski, 20th-century German-American astronomer || 
|-id=771
| 11771 Maestlin || 4136 T-2 || Michael Maestlin (1550–1631), professor of astronomy at Tübingen. || 
|-id=772
| 11772 Jacoblemaire || 4210 T-2 || Jacob Le Maire, Dutch explorer, after whom the Straits of Lemaire are named; he was, along with Schouten, one of the first westerners to visit Tonga † || 
|-id=773
| 11773 Schouten || 1021 T-3 || Willem Schouten, Dutch explorer who discovered Cape Horn † || 
|-id=774
| 11774 Jerne || 1128 T-3 || Niels Kaj Jerne, British-born (of Danish parentage) immunologist, joint winner of the 1984 Nobel Prize for Medicine and Physiology. || 
|-id=775
| 11775 Köhler || 3224 T-3 || Georges J. F. Köhler, German biologist, joint winner of the 1984 Nobel Prize for Medicine and Physiology. || 
|-id=776
| 11776 Milstein || 3460 T-3 || César Milstein, Argentinian biochemist, joint winner of the 1984 Nobel Prize for Medicine and Physiology. || 
|-id=777
| 11777 Hargrave || 3526 T-3 || Lawrence Hargrave (1850–1915), Australian astronomer and aviation pioneer. || 
|-id=778
| 11778 Kingsford Smith || 4102 T-3 || Sir Charles Edward Kingsford Smith, Australian aviator. || 
|-id=779
| 11779 Zernike || 4197 T-3 || Frits Zernike, Dutch physicist, winner of the 1953 Nobel Prize for Physics † || 
|-id=780
| 11780 Thunder Bay || 1942 TB || Thunder Bay, located on the shores of Lake Superior, is the most populous municipality in Northwestern Ontario, Canada. Formed in 1970 as the amalgamation of two cities, Thunder Bay is known as "the Lakehead" because it is Canada's westernmost port on the Great Lakes and the end of Great Lakes Navigation. || 
|-id=781
| 11781 Alexroberts || 1966 PL || Alexander William Roberts, Scottish-South African astronomer || 
|-id=782
| 11782 Nikolajivanov ||  || Nikolaj Mikhajlovich Ivanov (born 1937), a specialist in ballistics, is head of the Russian Ballistic Center, which controls missions of crewed and uncrewed spacecraft in near, middle and deep space. He is the author of many scientific articles, monographs and popular scientific brochures. || 
|-id=785
| 11785 Migaic ||  || Moscow State University of Geodesy and Cartography (formerly Moscow Institute of Geodesy, Air-Photography and Cartography) is the only educational institution in Russia that trains specialists in geodesy, geodynamics, astronomy, cosmic geodesy and the making of optical and electronic devices. || 
|-id=786
| 11786 Bakhchivandji || 1977 QW || Grigorij Yakovlevich Bakhchivandji (1909–1943) was a Soviet test pilot and pioneer in rocket flights who in 1942 piloted the first flight on the rocket-propelled experimental aircraft BI-1 of Bolkhovitinov and Isaev. || 
|-id=787
| 11787 Baumanka ||  || Bauman Moscow Technical University, founded in 1830, is a well-known higher education and research institution in Russia that trains specialists in many branches of technology and science. || 
|-id=788
| 11788 Nauchnyj ||  || Nauchnyj, Crimea, Ukraine, created at the same time as the Crimean Astrophysical Observatory in 1945 || 
|-id=789
| 11789 Kempowski || 1977 RK || Walter Kempowski (born 1929), one of the most important contemporary German writers. || 
|-id=790
| 11790 Goode || 1978 RU || Philip R. Goode (born 1943), a professor at the New Jersey Institute of Technology and director of Big Bear Solar Observatory. || 
|-id=791
| 11791 Sofiyavarzar ||  || Sofiya Mikhajlovna Varzar (1878–1957), an expert on the dynamics of minor planets. || 
|-id=792
| 11792 Sidorovsky ||  || Lev Isaevich Sidorovsky (born 1934) is a well-known St. Petersburg journalist whose initiatives on rehabilitation of historical truth and creation of new cultural traditions, in particular the annual celebration of Pushkin's Lyceum Day, have received public recognition. || 
|-id=793
| 11793 Chujkovia ||  || Elizaveta Fedorovna Chujkova (1865–1958), mother of twelve children, showed courage in preventing the demolition of a church in her home village of Serebryanye Prudy, not far from Moscow, in the 1930s. Among her descendants are writers and cultural workers. || 
|-id=794
| 11794 Yokokebukawa ||  || Yoko Kebukawa (born 1981) is a Professor in the Faculty of Engineering of the Yokohama National University who specializes in the cosmochemistry of meteorites. || 
|-id=795
| 11795 Fredrikbruhn ||  || Fredrik Bruhn is a specialist in miniaturized multifunctional system architecture for satellites and robotics. || 
|-id=796
| 11796 Nirenberg ||  || Louis Nirenberg (1925–2020), a Canadian-American mathematician, is an expert in the theory of differential equations, mathematical physics and functional analysis. || 
|-id=797
| 11797 Warell ||  || Johan Warell (born 1970) is well known for his high-resolution imaging and spectroscopy of the planet Mercury with the Swedish solar telescope and the Nordic optical telescope on La Palma. || 
|-id=798
| 11798 Davidsson ||  || The Ph.D. work of Björn Davidsson (born 1974) at Uppsala University opened up new insights about the outgassing mechanism and splitting mechanics of cometary nuclei. || 
|-id=799
| 11799 Lantz ||  || Cateline Lantz (born 1989) is a postdoctoral researcher at the Massachusetts Institute of Technology whose investigations include the processes of space weathering on carbonaceous asteroids. || 
|-id=800
| 11800 Carrozzo ||  || Filippo Giacomo Carrozzo (born 1978) is a researcher at Istituto di Astrofisica e Planetologia Spaziali (IAPS-Rome) whose work includes mineralogical mapping of Vesta and Ceres using Dawn spacecraft data. || 
|}

11801–11900 

|-
| 11801 Frigeri ||  || Alessandro Frigeri (born 1973) is a researcher at the Istituto di Astrofisica e Planetologia Spaziali (IAPS-Rome) who has created spectral parameter maps of Vesta using data from the Dawn spacecraft mission. || 
|-id=802
| 11802 Ivanovski ||  || Stavro Lambrov Ivanovski (born 1977) is a scientist at Istituto di Astrofisica e Planetologia Spaziali (IAPS-Rome) whose research includes the dynamics of aspherical dust grains in cometary atmospheres. || 
|-id=803
| 11803 Turrini ||  || Diego Turrini (born 1979) is a scientist at the Istituto di Astrofisica e Planetologia Spaziali (IAPS-Rome) whose work includes modeling the source of olivine on Vesta as detected by the Dawn spacecraft mission. || 
|-id=804
| 11804 Zambon ||  || Francesca Zambon (born 1981) is a researcher at the Istituto di Astrofisica e Planetologia Spaziali (IAPS-Rome) who uses Dawn spacecraft spectral data to map the mineralogy of both Vesta and Ceres. || 
|-id=805
| 11805 Novaković ||  || Bojan Novaković (born 1976) is a professor at the University of Belgrade who has performed analyses of asteroid collisional families and their association with active asteroids. || 
|-id=806
| 11806 Thangjam ||  || Guneshwar Thangjam (born 1985) is a researcher at the Max-Planck Institute (Göttingen) performing spectral analyses of Vesta's compositional heterogeneity using Dawn spacecraft data. || 
|-id=807
| 11807 Wannberg ||  || Asta Pellinen-Wannberg (born 1953) is a Swedish geophysicist and astronomer at Umeå University known for radar observation of meteors. She studies interaction of small meteoroids with the atmosphere using high-power large-aperture radars. || 
|-id=808
| 11808 Platz ||  || Thomas Platz (born 1975) is a researcher at the Max Planck Institute and member of the Dawn mission framing camera team studying surface ice deposits on Ceres. || 
|-id=809
| 11809 Shinnaka ||  || Yoshiharu Shinnaka (born 1986) is a Japanese astronomer studying the physicochemical evolution of the early solar nebula through measurements of isotopic ratios of molecules in comets. || 
|-id=810
| 11810 Preusker ||  || Frank Preusker (born 1975) is a geologist at the German Aerospace Center (DLR-Berlin) whose work includes digital terrain models of both Vesta and Ceres using Dawn spacecraft images. || 
|-id=811
| 11811 Martinrubin ||  || Martin Rubin (born 1977) is a researcher at the Physikalisches Institut, Universität Bern (Switzerland) who specializes in the detection of molecules in comets and served as a member of the Rosetta mission team. || 
|-id=812
| 11812 Dongqiao ||  || Dong Qiao (born 1979) is a professor at the Beijing Institute of Technology whose work includes target selection and trajectory design for the Chang'e-2 flyby mission of (4179) Toutatis. || 
|-id=813
| 11813 Ingorichter ||  || Ingo Richter (born 1964) is a scientist at the Braunschweig University of Technology (Germany) whose research includes detection and analysis of asteroid magnetic fields and comet solar wind interactions using spacecraft measurements. || 
|-id=814
| 11814 Schwamb ||  || Megan E. Schwamb (born 1984), a discoverer of minor planets and scientist at the Gemini Observatory in Hilo, Hawaii, whose research includes the search for TNOs. || 
|-id=815
| 11815 Viikinkoski ||  || Matti Viikinkoski (born 1976) is a postdoctoral researcher at the Tampere University of Technology (Finland) who develops mathematical methods and algorithms for asteroid shape and spin modeling. || 
|-id=816
| 11816 Vasile ||  || Massimiliano Vasile (born 1970) is a professor at the University of Strathclyde (UK) whose work includes design and optimization of space flight trajectories. || 
|-id=817
| 11817 Oguri ||  || Junko Oguri (born 1977) is a librarian at the National Astronomical Observatory of Japan. She is also a renowned paper cutout artist whose subjects include asteroids and comets. || 
|-id=818
| 11818 Ulamec ||  || Stephan Ulamec (born 1966) is a researcher at the German Aerospace Center (DLR-Berlin) who served as the project manager of Philae, the lander carried aboard ESA's Rosetta mission. || 
|-id=819
| 11819 Millarca ||  || Millarca Valenzuela (born 1977) is a geologist at the Pontificia Universidad Catolica de Chile, and a specialist in meteorites, undertaking many search expeditions in the Atacama Desert. || 
|-id=820
| 11820 Mikiyasato ||  || Mikiya Sato (born 1967) is a Japanese amateur astronomer who studies dust trails of meteor showers, notably the Phoenicids. || 
|-id=821
| 11821 Coleman ||  || Paul Henry Ikaika Coleman (1955–2018) was the first Native Hawaiian to earn a doctorate in astrophysics for his study of distant galaxies. He was a passionate advocate for astronomy and was dedicated to increasing Native Hawaiian participation in the sciences. Me ou mau k\={u}puna e Paul e ho`okele aku ai i n\=a moana h\={o}k\={u} \=akea. || 
|-id=823
| 11823 Christen || 1981 VF || Roland W. Christen, an optician and maker of affordable apochromatic refractors at the forefront of mechanical and optical design. || 
|-id=824
| 11824 Alpaidze ||  || Galaktion Yeliseyevich Alpaidze, Russian chief of the Plesetsk Cosmodrome (1963–1975) || 
|-id=826
| 11826 Yurijgromov ||  || Yurij Iosifovich Gromov, professor of humanities and social sciences at St. Petersburg University. || 
|-id=827
| 11827 Wasyuzan ||  || Wasyuzan, a hill commanding a fine view of the Inland Sea, in Kurashiki, Okayama prefecture. || 
|-id=828
| 11828 Vargha || 1984 DZ || Magda Vargha (1931–2010), librarian of Konkoly Observatory, Budapest, was the author of several books on the history of astronomy || 
|-id=829
| 11829 Tuvikene ||  || Tõnu Tuvikene (1952–2010) was an Estonian astronomer and staff member of Tartu Observatory who studied variable stars || 
|-id=830
| 11830 Jessenius || 1984 JE || Jan Jesenius, Czech physician || 
|-id=832
| 11832 Pustylnik ||  || Izold Pustylnik (1938–2008), native of the Ukrainian city of Odessa, was a staff member of Tartu Observatory who authored numerous scientific publications and served as editor of the Central European Journal of Physics || 
|-id=833
| 11833 Dixon || 1985 RW || Roger Dixon (born 1947) is a staff physicist at the Fermi National Accelerator Laboratory in Batavia, Illinois, and Project Manager for the Cryogenic Dark Matter Search. He is in charge of and teaches in the Saturday morning physics program for high school students. || 
|-id=836
| 11836 Eileen || 1986 CB || Eileen Collins, astronaut, became in Feb. 1995 the first woman to pilot a shuttle mission. || 
|-id=842
| 11842 Kap'bos ||  || Kap'bos is a small village, about 20 km east of the city of Antwerp. || 
|-id=844
| 11844 Ostwald ||  || Friedrich Wilhelm Ostwald, 19th–20th-century Latvian-German chemist, founder of the Zeitschrift für Physikalische Chemie, Nobelist || 
|-id=846
| 11846 Verminnen ||  || Johan Verminnen, Flemish artist and songwriter. || 
|-id=847
| 11847 Winckelmann ||  || Johann Joachim Winckelmann, the German art historian. || 
|-id=848
| 11848 Paullouka ||  || Vital-Paul Delporte (born 1936) alias Paul Louka, is a Wallonian artist who expresses himself in composing, poetry, songs and painting. Following an encounter with Jacques Brel, he spent three years in Paris, where he performed in cabarets and theaters. He was director of the artists' organization Sabam for several years. || 
|-id=849
| 11849 Fauvel ||  || Charles Fauvel, a French aviator. || 
|-id=852
| 11852 Shoumen || 1988 RD || Shoumen University, successfully to develop education in astronomy, largely as a result of contributions by the first discoverer. || 
|-id=853
| 11853 Runge ||  || Philipp Otto Runge, German painter and graphic artist. || 
|-id=854
| 11854 Ludwigrichter ||  || Adrian Ludwig Richter, German artist. || 
|-id=855
| 11855 Preller ||  || Friedrich Preller the Elder, German painter and etcher. || 
|-id=856
| 11856 Nicolabonev ||  || Nicola Bonev (1898–1979) was for 40 years the head of the astronomy department at Sofia University and founder and director of the Institute of Astronomy of the Bulgarian Academy of Sciences. He was known for his research in celestial mechanics, theoretical astronomy, solar activity, lunar studies and cosmology || 
|-id=858
| 11858 Devinpoland ||  || Devin Patrick Poland (born 1986) is the Mission Operations Manager of the Lucy spacecraft. || 
|-id=859
| 11859 Danngarcia ||  || Dann Garcia (born 1977) is the deputy lead of L'SPACE, the "Lucy Student Collaboration" for the Lucy mission. || 
|-id=860
| 11860 Uedasatoshi || 1988 UP || Satoshi Ueda (born 1954) is the astronomical head of the Kagoshima Municipal Science Hall and is also a well-known amateur astronomer. His main activities include a continuous search for supernovae at his private observatory as well as the organizing of local star parties. || 
|-id=861
| 11861 Teruhime ||  || Teruhime (1552–1627), wife and supporter of Kuroda Kanbe, who was instrumental in helping Japan end the Age of Civil Wars. || 
|-id=868
| 11868 Kleinrichert || 1989 TY || Michelle Kleinrichert Binzel (born 1959) is an adjunct professor of business at Bentley College who also raises and trains guide dogs for the blind. She is the wife of the discoverer. || 
|-id=870
| 11870 Sverige ||  || Sverige (Sweden) is a nation in northern Europe, located on the Scandinavian peninsula together with Norway. || 
|-id=871
| 11871 Norge ||  || Norway (Norge) is a nation in northern Europe, well known for its beautiful coast. || 
|-id=873
| 11873 Kokuseibi ||  || "Kokuseibi" is another name for The National Museum of Western Art. It opened in 1959 to introduce Western arts to the Japanese public. The core of the collection was the Matsukata Collection of Impressionist-school paintings and Rodin sculptures. || 
|-id=874
| 11874 Gringauz ||  || Konstantin Gringauz (1918–1993) became involved in ionospheric studies early in his career. He participated in the launching of Sputnik 1 by constructing the beep-beep transmitter. During 1982–1986 he was responsible for designing and implementing plasma experiments aboard VEGA 1 and 2. || 
|-id=875
| 11875 Rhône ||  || The Rhône, a major river in France, has been an important highway for the transportation of merchandise since the time of the Greeks and Romans. Rising in the Swiss Alps, the river flows through Lake Geneva and the cities of Lyon, Valence and Avignon, reaching the Mediterranean Sea at Marseille after 813 km. || 
|-id=876
| 11876 Doncarpenter ||  || For the past 42 years, Don Carpenter (born 1938) has been associated with the Stanford research group devoted to passive and active whistler-mode probing of the earth's ionosphere and magnetosphere. In 1966 he discovered the plasmapause in the electron-density distribution of the magnetosphere. || 
|-id=878
| 11878 Hanamiyama || 1990 HJ || Hanamiyama, Japanese mountain. || 
|-id=881
| 11881 Mirstation ||  || The Russian space station Mir, launched in 1986, remained in service for more than 15 years as a laboratory for a wealth of scientific experiments performed on board by international crews. || 
|-id=885
| 11885 Summanus || 1990 SS || Summanus was the Etruscan or Roman deity responsible for nocturnal lightning and thunder, as Jupiter was in daytime. This was the first earth-approacher discovered automatically by software and (lightning-fast) electronic computer; J. V. Scotti used D. L. Rabinowitz's Moving Object Detection Program at the telescope || 
|-id=886
| 11886 Kraske ||  || Konrad Kraske (born 1926) served as a member of the supervisory board of the public German TV net ZDF since its foundation in 1962---the last decade as its chairman. Kraske was primarily engaged in the development of highly demanding TV channels. The name was suggested by the first discoverer. || 
|-id=887
| 11887 Echemmon ||  || The Trojan hero Echemmon, son of the King Priam, who was killed together with his brother Chromius by Diomedes, king of Argos. || 
|-id=895
| 11895 Dehant ||  || Véronique Dehant, head of the section for time, Earth rotation and space geodesy at the Royal Observatory, Uccle. She is currently involved with the NEIGE project, which plans a soft landing of a geodetic instrument on Mars. In 1999 she was awarded the Bomford prize for her work on the earth's nutation. || 
|-id=896
| 11896 Camelbeeck ||  || Thierry Camelbeeck (born 1956), a seismologist at the Royal Observatory, Uccle. || 
|-id=897
| 11897 Lemaire ||  || Joseph F. Lemaire (born 1939), head of the Fundamental Dynamics section at the Belgian Institute for Space Aeronomy, Uccle. || 
|-id=898
| 11898 Dedeyn ||  || Peter Paul De Deyn (born 1957), head of the Laboratory of Neurochemistry and Behavior at the Born-Bunge Foundation of the University of Antwerp. || 
|-id=899
| 11899 Weill ||  || Kurt Weill, German-American composer. || 
|-id=900
| 11900 Spinoy ||  || Constant Spinoy (1924–1997) was a famous Belgian artist and engraver who specialised in the design of postage stamps, of which he engraved more than 100. These include Vielsalm, Towers of Ghent and Double astrograph at the Royal Observatory of Uccle. In 1977 he was honored with the Prize of Europe for his Jeugdfilatelie. || 
|}

11901–12000 

|-id=905
| 11905 Giacometti ||  || Alberto Giacometti (1901–1966), a Swiss sculptor whose work is often compared to that of the Existentialists, contrasted with the avant-garde in that it attempted to equal reality so that a sculpture, like Observing Head (1927), would be perceived as if it were alive. Other masterpieces are The Palace at 4 a.m. and 1 + 1 = 3. || 
|-id=907
| 11907 Näränen ||  || Jyri Näränen (born 1979) is a Finnish astronomer who works on the surface composition and structure of Mercury and the Moon || 
|-id=908
| 11908 Nicaragua ||  || Nicaragua is the largest country in the Central American isthmus. || 
|-id=911
| 11911 Angel || 1992 LF || Founder and director of Steward Observatory's mirror lab at the University of Arizona, Tucson, Roger Angel (born 1941) has spearheaded the development of telescope mirrors as large as eight meters in diameter by a process called spin-casting. His work and ideas have resulted in an enormous increase in telescope light-gathering power || 
|-id=912
| 11912 Piedade ||  || Serra de Piedade in the Brazilian state of Minas Gerais, east of the capital of Belo Horizonte, is the location of the Piedade Observatory. During the 1970s the discoverer spent many hours there observing variable stars || 
|-id=913
| 11913 Svarna ||  || Anneta Svarna (born 1951) is a mathematical logician who works on information theory for the European Union. The author of many publications on mathematical logic, in 1998 she published (with D. Sinachopoulos) an important paper on Greek philosophy: Why Plato was against observational astronomy || 
|-id=914
| 11914 Sinachopoulos ||  || Dimitrios Sinachopoulos (born 1951) is an astrophysicist at the National Observatory of Athens who conducts observational and theoretical work on galactic lenses. In 1991 he wrote (with A. Svarna) The Teachings of Astronomy in Plato's Republic. He has often helped the discoverer with the treatment of CCD frames || 
|-id=915
| 11915 Nishiinoue ||  || Tsuyoshi Nishiinoue (born 1954) studied at the Department of Earth and Planetary Sciences at the Western Australian Museum in 1991. Upon his return to Japan, he became director of Kihoku Observatory, in Kagoshima prefecture, in 1995. He remains a scholar and popularizer of astronomy. || 
|-id=916
| 11916 Wiesloch ||  || Wiesloch, a German city in northern Baden-Württemberg. It celebrates the 1200th anniversary of its first documented mention in mid–2001. Situated some 16 km south of the famous Heidelberg-Königstuhl Observatory, it became the home town of the first discoverer more than 30 years ago. || 
|-id=921
| 11921 Mitamasahiro ||  || Masahiro Mita (born 1948) is a well-known writer. In 1977 he won the Akutagawa Prize, which is one of the most important prizes in Japan for a novelist || 
|-id=925
| 11925 Usubae ||  || Usubae at Cape Ashizuri in western Kochi prefecture is a beautiful beach featuring many strange rock formations. It is a famous spot for fishing and well known as the first place in the Japanese archipelago that the Kuroshio ocean current reaches || 
|-id=926
| 11926 Orinoco ||  || The Orinoco, a river in the extreme northern part of South America, has its source in the Parima mountain range on the Venezuelan-Brazilian border. Draining 880~000 km 2 of the Colombian and Venezuelan region, it forms an enormous delta before reaching the Atlantic Ocean near the island of Trinidad || 
|-id=927
| 11927 Mount Kent || 1993 BA || Mount Kent Observatory is a facility for astronomical education, research and outreach operated by the University of Southern Queensland. It provides remote and robotic observing, in partnership with the University of Louisville, the University of Queensland and Automated Patrol Telescopes Australia. || 
|-id=928
| 11928 Akimotohiro ||  || Hiroyuki Akimoto (born 1967) is editor-in-chief of the Japanese monthly astronomical magazine Gekkan Tenmon Guide. He has edited many books on astronomy || 
|-id=929
| 11929 Uchino ||  || Satoshi Uchino (born 1935), for many years the chief secretary of the Kawasaki Astronomical Association, has greatly contributed to the popularization of astronomy || 
|-id=930
| 11930 Osamu ||  || Oshima Osamu (born 1959) is a leading amateur astronomer and science teacher in Gunma prefecture and volunteer science instructor in great favor with children. His interests in astronomy are wide, currently CCD imaging of planetary nebulae || 
|-id=933
| 11933 Himuka || 1993 ES || Himuka is an old Japanese name for the Miyazaki prefecture region. The name was selected among other candidates proposed by children who attended the Fureai Space Festival, held in Miyazaki city on the 2004 Space Day in Japan || 
|-id=934
| 11934 Lundgren ||  || Kjell Lundgren (b.~1950) who has studied red giants in the LMC and the Fornax dwarf galaxy, is now working as an engineer at Uppsala Astronomical Observatory || 
|-id=935
| 11935 Olakarlsson ||  || Ola Karlsson (born 1973) has for several years been studying Jupiter Trojans, both by physical observations and by numerical integrations resulting in his thesis A Study of Jupiter Trojans. || 
|-id=936
| 11936 Tremolizzo ||  || Elena Tremolizzo (born 1972) is an attitude and orbit control systems engineer at the European Space Agency, involved in the SMART-1 mission to the Moon and the European global navigation satellite system, Galileo. || 
|-id=941
| 11941 Archinal ||  || Brent Archinal, American astronomer  || 
|-id=942
| 11942 Guettard || 1993 NV || Jean-Étienne Guettard (1715–1786) was a French geologist and mineralogist. From the evidence of fossils found in the volcanic hills of the Puy de Dôme, in south-central France, he concluded correctly that they conflicted with the time scheme of the Old Testament. || 
|-id=943
| 11943 Davidhartley ||  || David Hartley (1705–1757) was an English physician and philosopher who attempted to explain how thought processes occur. His major work, Observations on Man, His Frame, His Duty and His Expectations, is important in the history of psychology for suggesting that body and mind function in concert. || 
|-id=944
| 11944 Shaftesbury ||  || Anthony Ashley-Cooper, 3rd Earl of Shaftesbury (1671–1713), an English politician, philosopher and writer || 
|-id=945
| 11945 Amsterdam ||  || Amsterdam, the Netherlands || 
|-id=946
| 11946 Bayle ||  || Pierre Bayle (1647–1706), a French philosopher who wrote the Historical and Critical Dictionary. Because it deliberately tried to destroy orthodox Christian beliefs, he aroused the ire of many of his colleagues. In 1682 he published some reflections on the comet of 1680, deriding the superstition that comets presage catastrophes. || 
|-id=947
| 11947 Kimclijsters ||  || Kim Clijsters, Belgian tennis player † || 
|-id=948
| 11948 Justinehénin ||  || Justine Hénin-Hardenne, Belgian tennis player † || 
|-id=949
| 11949 Kagayayutaka ||  || Yutaka Kagaya (born 1968) is a well-known Japanese space artist who received the Gold Medal in the American Digital Art Contest in 2000 || 
|-id=950
| 11950 Morellet ||  || André Morellet (1727–1819), a French economist, philosopher, and writer, left his Mémoires sur le XVIIIesiècle et la Révolution (1821), a precious document about the eighteenth century. Besides several articles for Diderot's Encyclopédie, he refuted, in 1770, Galiani's Dialogues sur le commerce des blés. || 
|-id=955
| 11955 Russrobb ||  || Russell M. Robb (born 1952), astronomer at the University of Victoria, played the leading role in automating the university's 0.5-m telescope and equipping it with a CCD camera. The telescope has been used extensively in the university's observational programs, including astrometric work on comets and minor planets. || 
|-id=956
| 11956 Tamarakate ||  || Tamara Kate Peiser (born 2001) is the second daughter of Gillian and Benny Peiser. Her father, an anthropologist at Liverpool John Moores University, is known the world over for the Cambridge Conference network || 
|-id=958
| 11958 Galiani ||  || Abbé Ferdinando Galiani (1728–1787), secretary at the Neapolitan Embassy in Paris from 1759 to 1769, is well known for his witty Dialogues sur le commerce des blés (1768), in which he attacked the doctrine of free market of the physiocrates. He was much esteemed by d´Holbach || 
|-id=959
| 11959 Okunokeno ||  || Keno Okuno (born 1932), an amateur astronomer and a member of the Kawasaki Astronomical Association, has greatly contributed to the popularization of astronomy || 
|-id=963
| 11963 Ignace ||  || Ignace Van der Gucht (born 1959) is a graduate in electronics and chief of construction at the Royal Observatory at Uccle, where he places his abilities at the disposal of his colleagues, particularly when they have problems with configuring and upgrading their computers || 
|-id=964
| 11964 Prigogine ||  || Ilya Prigogine (1917–2003), a Belgian-Russian chemist who was honored with the 1977 Nobel Prize in chemistry for his work on non-equilibrium thermodynamics. He was born in Moscow, he moved to Belgium in 1929, where he studied and worked at the Université Libre de Bruxelles, especially on dissipative structures. || 
|-id=965
| 11965 Catullus ||  || Catullus (c. 84–54 BCE), a Latin poet of the late Roman Republic, whose work focused on personal life rather than classical heroes. || 
|-id=966
| 11966 Plateau ||  || Joseph Antoine Ferdinand Plateau (1801–1883) was a Belgian physicist who stated the so-called "Plateau-problem". The proof of the existence of a minimal surface (of least area) bounded by a simple closed curve in space was solved in 1930 by means of variational analysis || 
|-id=967
| 11967 Boyle ||  || Robert Boyle (1627–1691) was an Anglo-Irish physicist and philosopher well known for his experiments with gases, leading to the discovery that the volume of a gas is inversely proportional to its pressure. In 1661 he developed the concept of primary particles (the critical chymist). || 
|-id=968
| 11968 Demariotte ||  || Edmé de Mariotte (1620–1684) was a French physicist who discovered independently of Boyle that the volume of a gas varies inversely with pressure. He proposed the word "barometer" for the instrument measuring the pressure of air and stated that Boyle's law holds only if there is no change in temperature || 
|-id=969
| 11969 Gay-Lussac ||  || Joseph Louis Gay-Lussac (1778–1850) was a French chemist and physicist, one of the founders of meteorology. In 1802 he showed that all gases expand by the same fraction of their volume with temperature. However, he is primarily known for his law stating that "gases combine in very simple proportions". || 
|-id=970
| 11970 Palitzsch || 1994 TD || Johann Georg Palitzsch (1723–1788) was a German farmer by profession and an astronomer by vocation. He recovered comet 1P/Halley on its first predicted return in 1758 and observed further comets, as well as variable stars such as Mira and Algol. The citation was prepared by P. Brosche. || 
|-id=974
| 11974 Yasuhidefujita || 1994 YF || Yasuhide Fujita (born 1961) is a Japanese amateur astronomer and discoverer of minor planets. He is a staff member at the Board of Education in Kuma Town. He worked as a researcher at the Kuma Kogen Astronomical Observatory for eight years (1992–1999) and independently discovered the supernova 1994I. || 
|-id=976
| 11976 Josephthurn || 1995 JG || Count Joseph Thurn (1761–1831), an admiral in the Borbonic fleet, was in command of the Austrian emperor's troops. He spent part of his life in Gorizia, where in 1831 was founded the Monte di Pietá and Cassa di Risparmio || 
|-id=977
| 11977 Leonrisoldi || 1995 OA || Leon Risoldi (born 2009), the first grandson of one of the discoverers at Santa Lucia observatory. || 
|-id=978
| 11978 Makotomasako ||  || Makoto Shima (born 1923) and his wife Masako Shima (born 1930) are both experts in the study of meteorites. Makoto published many books on meteorites and cosmic dust, and Masako's specialties are the chemical composition and origin of meteorites, especially the analysis of cosmic-ray-produced nuclides || 
|-id=980
| 11980 Ellis ||  || Kerry Ellis (born 1965) a Canadian physicist, wrote a thesis at the University of Western Ontario in electrical engineering and specialized in meteor burst communication. || 
|-id=981
| 11981 Boncompagni ||  || Baldassarre Boncompagni (1821–1894) was an Italian aristocrat, historian of mathematics, and editor of 20 volumes of Bullettino di Bibliografia e Storia delle Scienze Matematiche e fisiche. This monumental work, published in Rome during 1868–1887, was fundamental in the history of the mathematical and physical sciences, with many articles on the history of astronomy. || 
|-id=984
| 11984 Manet ||  || Édouard Manet (1832–1883), a French painter who was a pivotal figure in the transition of realism to impressionism. He is well known for his The Luncheon on the Grass (1863), Olympia (1863) and Folies-Bergère (1882) || 
|-id=987
| 11987 Yonematsu ||  || Yonematsu Shiono (born 1947) is an investigator of traditional life in Japan and has published many articles and books on it. He also published many books on outdoor life, including astronomical observations || 
|-id=997
| 11997 Fassel ||  || Deborah Elizabeth Fassel (born 1950) and Charles Sebastian Fassel (born 1955) are Canadian amateur astronomers who live in St. Catharines, Ontario. || 
|-id=998
| 11998 Fermilab ||  || Fermi National Accelerator Laboratory, USA || 
|}

References 

011001-012000